The 2019 Canadian federal election took place on Monday, 21 October 2019. Candidates have been declared for each of the 338 electoral districts or "ridings".

Abbreviations guide
italics indicates a party deregistered by Elections Canada before the next election.
Animal – Animal Protection Party of Canada
BQ – Bloc Québécois
CFF – Canada's Fourth Front
CHP – Christian Heritage Party
CNP – Canadian Nationalist Party
Comm. – Communist Party
Conservative – Conservative Party
Green – Green Party
Ind. – Independent
Liberal – Liberal Party
Libert. – Libertarian Party
Mar. – Marijuana Party
M-L – Marxist–Leninist Party
NA – No Affiliation
NCA – National Citizens Alliance
NDP – New Democratic Party
PC – Progressive Canadian Party
PIQ – Parti pour l'Indépendance du Québec
PPC – People's Party of Canada
Rhino. – Rhinoceros Party
SCC – Stop Climate Change Party
unreg. – Party not yet eligible for registration with Elections Canada
UPC – United Party of Canada
VCP – Veterans Coalition Party of Canada

Candidates and results
Note: Candidates' names are as registered with Elections Canada.
† = Not seeking re-election
‡ = Running for re-election in different riding
§ = represents that the incumbent was defeated for nomination
$ = represents that the incumbent was announced as nominated by their party but later chose to retire
# = represents that the incumbent was announced as nominated by their party but later lost that party's nomination through departure from caucus
Bold indicates party leader.

Newfoundland and Labrador

|-
| style="background-color:whitesmoke" |Avalon
||
|Kenneth McDonald19,12246.26%
|
|Matthew Chapman12,85531.10%
|
|Lea Mary Movelle7,14217.28%
|
|Greg Malone2,2155.36%
|
|
||
|Ken McDonald (politician)|Ken McDonald
|-
| style="background-color:whitesmoke" |Bonavista—Burin—Trinity
||
|Churence Rogers14,70745.70%
|
|Sharon Vokey12,69739.46%
|
|Matthew Cooper3,85511.98%
|
|Kelsey Reichel9202.86%
|
|
||
|Churence Rogers
|-
| style="background-color:whitesmoke" |Coast of Bays—Central—Notre Dame 
||
|Scott Simms16,51448.31%
|
|Alex Bracci12,08135.34%
|
|Noel Joe4,22412.36%
|
|Byron White1,3633.99%
|
|
||
|Scott Simms
|-
| style="background-color:whitesmoke" |Labrador
||
|Yvonne Jones4,85142.48%
|
|Larry Flemming3,54831.07%
|
|Michelene Gray2,79624.49%
|
|Tyler Colbourne2241.96%
|
|
||
|Yvonne Jones
|-
| style="background-color:whitesmoke" |Long Range Mountains
||
|Gudie Hutchings18,19947.36%
|
|Josh Eisses10,87328.30%
|
|Holly Pike7,60919.80%
|
|Lucas Knill1,3343.47%
|
|Robert Miles (VCP)4111.07%
||
|Gudie Hutchings
|-
| style="background-color:whitesmoke" |St. John's East
|
|Nick Whalen14,96233.20%
|
|Joedy Wall8,14118.06%
||
|Jack Harris21,14846.92%
|
|David Peters8211.82%
|
|
||
|Nick Whalen
|-
|rowspan=2 style="background-color:whitesmoke" |St. John's South—Mount Pearl
|rowspan=2 |
|rowspan=2 |Seamus O'Regan20,79351.13%
|rowspan=2 |
|rowspan=2 |Terry Martin7,76719.10%
|rowspan=2 |
|rowspan=2 |Anne Marie Anonsen10,89026.78%
|rowspan=2 |
|rowspan=2 |Alexandra Hayward7401.82%
|
|David Jones (CHP)141 0.35%
|rowspan=2 |
|rowspan=2 |Seamus O'Regan
|-
|
|Benjamin Ruckpaul (PPC)335 0.82%
|}
<noinclude>

Prince Edward Island

|-
| style="background-color:whitesmoke" |Cardigan
||
|Lawrence MacAulay10,93949.35%
|
|Wayne Phelan6,43929.05%
|
|Lynne Thiele1,4816.68%
|
|Glen Beaton3,06813.84%
|
|Christene Squires2401.08%
||
|Lawrence MacAulay
|-
| style="background-color:whitesmoke" |Charlottetown
||
|Sean Casey8,81244.26%
|
|Robert A. Campbell4,04020.29%
|
|Joe Byrne2,23811.24%
|
|Darcie Lanthier4,64823.35%
|
|Fred MacLeod1720.86%
||
|Sean Casey
|-
| style="background-color:whitesmoke" |Egmont
||
|Bobby Morrissey8,01639.73%
|
|Logan McLellan6,93434.36%
|
|Sharon Dunn1,2306.10%
|
|Alex Clark3,99819.81%
|
|
||
|Bobby Morrissey
|-
| style="background-color:whitesmoke" |Malpeque
||
|Wayne Easter9,53341.38%
|
|Stephen Stewart5,90825.64%
|
|Craig Nash1,4956.49%
|
|Anna Keenan6,10326.49%
|
|
||
|Wayne Easter
|}<noinclude>

Nova Scotia

|-
|rowspan=2 style="background-color:whitesmoke" |Cape Breton—Canso
|rowspan=2 |
|rowspan=2 |Mike Kelloway16,69438.88%
|rowspan=2 |
|rowspan=2 |Alfie MacLeod14,82134.52%
|rowspan=2 |
|rowspan=2 |Laurie Suitor6,35414.80%
|rowspan=2 |
|rowspan=2 |Clive Doucet3,3217.73%
|rowspan=2 |
|rowspan=2 |Billy Joyce9252.15%
|
|Michelle Dockrill (Ind.)685 1.60%
|rowspan=2 |
|rowspan=2 |Rodger Cuzner†
|-
|
|Darlene Lynn LeBlanc (NCA)140 0.33%
|-
|rowspan=2 style="background-color:whitesmoke" |Central Nova
|rowspan=2 |
|rowspan=2 |Sean Fraser20,71846.59%
|rowspan=2 |
|rowspan=2 |George Canyon13,20129.69%
|rowspan=2 |
|rowspan=2 |Betsy MacDonald5,80613.06%
|rowspan=2 |
|rowspan=2 |Barry Randle3,4787.82%
|rowspan=2 |
|rowspan=2 |Al Muir9382.11%
|
|Chris Frazer (Comm.)180 0.40%
|rowspan=2 |
|rowspan=2 |Sean Fraser
|-
|
|Michael Slowik (Ind.)149 0.34%
|-
|rowspan=3 style="background-color:whitesmoke" |Cumberland—Colchester
|rowspan=3 |
|rowspan=3 |Lenore Zann16,67236.68%
|rowspan=3 |
|rowspan=3 |Scott Armstrong16,21935.69%
|rowspan=3 |
|rowspan=3 |Larry Duchesne5,45111.99%
|rowspan=3 |
|rowspan=3 |Jason Blanch6,01513.23%
|rowspan=3 |
|rowspan=3 |William Archer6081.34%
|
|Stephen J Garvey (NCA)109 0.24%
|rowspan=3 |
|rowspan=3 |Bill Casey†
|-
|
|Jody O'Blenis (VCP)144 0.32%
|-
|
|Matthew V. Rushton (Ind.)232 0.51%
|-
| style="background-color:whitesmoke" |Dartmouth—Cole Harbour
||
|Darren Fisher24,25945.34%
|
|Jason Cole8,63816.15%
|
|Emma Norton14,43526.98%
|
|Lil MacPherson5,2809.87%
|
|Michelle Lindsay8871.66%
|
|
||
|Darren Fisher
|-
| style="background-color:whitesmoke" |Halifax
||
|Andy Fillmore23,68142.48%
|
|Bruce Holland6,45611.58%
|
|Christine Saulnier16,74730.04%
|
|Jo-Ann Roberts8,01314.37%
|
|Duncan McGenn6331.14%
|
|Bill Wilson (Animal)2220.40%
||
|Andy Fillmore
|-
| style="background-color:whitesmoke" |Halifax West
||
|Geoff Regan26,88549.46%
|
|Fred Shuman10,48819.30%
|
|Jacob Wilson10,42919.19%
|
|Richard Zurawski6,55512.06%
|
|
|
|
||
|Geoff Regan
|-
|rowspan=2 style="background-color:whitesmoke" |Kings—Hants
|rowspan=2 |
|rowspan=2 |Kody Blois20,80643.31%
|rowspan=2 |
|rowspan=2 |Martha MacQuarrie11,90524.78%
|rowspan=2 |
|rowspan=2 |Stephen Schneider8,25417.18%
|rowspan=2 |
|rowspan=2 |Brogan Anderson6,02912.55%
|rowspan=2 |
|rowspan=2 |Matthew Southall7861.64%
|
|Stacey Dodge (VCP)118 0.25%
|rowspan=2 |
|rowspan=2 |vacant
|-
|
|Nicholas Tan (Rhino.)138 0.29%
|-
| style="background-color:whitesmoke" |Sackville—Preston—Chezzetcook
||
|Darrell Samson19,92540.22%
|
|Kevin Copley11,21122.63%
|
|Matt Stickland11,86023.94%
|
|Anthony Edmonds5,72511.56%
|
|Sybil Hogg8161.65%
|
|
||
|Darrell Samson
|-
|rowspan=4 style="background-color:whitesmoke" |South Shore—St. Margarets
|rowspan=4 |
|rowspan=4 |Bernadette Jordan21,88641.67%
|rowspan=4 |
|rowspan=4 |Rick Perkins14,74428.07%
|rowspan=4 |
|rowspan=4 |Jessika Hepburn8,36115.92%
|rowspan=4 |
|rowspan=4 |Thomas Trappenberg6,07011.56%
|rowspan=4 |
|rowspan=4 |Robert Monk6671.27%
|
|Steven Foster (Ind.)376 0.72%
|rowspan=4 |
|rowspan=4 |Bernadette Jordan
|-
|
|Jason Matthews (VCP)125 0.24%
|-
|
|Shawn McMahon (Ind.)165 0.31%
|-
|
|Kevin Schulthies (CHP)124 0.24%
|-
|rowspan=3 style="background-color:whitesmoke" |Sydney—Victoria
|rowspan=3 |
|rowspan=3 |Jaime Battiste12,53630.90%
|rowspan=3 |
|rowspan=3 |Eddie Orrell11,22727.68%
|rowspan=3 |
|rowspan=3 |Jodi McDavid8,14620.08%
|rowspan=3 |
|rowspan=3 |Lois Foster2,2495.54%
|rowspan=3 |
|rowspan=3 |
|
|Randy Joy (VCP)248 0.61%
|rowspan=3 |
|rowspan=3 |Mark Eyking†
|-
|
|Archie MacKinnon (Ind.)5,679 14.00%
|-
|
|Kenzie MacNeil (Ind.)480 1.18%
|-
| style="background-color:whitesmoke" |West Nova
|
|Jason Deveau17,02536.38%
||
|Chris d'Entremont18,39039.30%
| 
|Matthew Dubois5,01010.71%
|
|Judy N Green5,93912.69%
|
|
|
|Gloria Jane Cook (VCP)4340.93%
||
|Colin Fraser†
|}<noinclude>

New Brunswick

|-
| style="background-color:whitesmoke" |Acadie—Bathurst
||
|Serge Cormier26,54755.14%
|
|Martine Savoie10,35221.50%
|
|Daniel Thériault6,96714.47%
|
|Robert Kryszko4,2778.88%
|
|
|
|
||
|Serge Cormier
|-
| style="background-color:whitesmoke" |Beauséjour
||
|Dominic LeBlanc24,94846.47%
|
|Vincent Cormier9,43817.58%
|
|Jean-Marc Bélanger3,9407.34%
|
|Laura Reinsborough14,30526.65%
|
|Nancy Mercier1,0541.96%
|
|
||
|Dominic LeBlanc
|-
|rowspan=3 style="background-color:whitesmoke" |Fredericton
|rowspan=3 |
|rowspan=3 |Matt DeCourcey13,54427.41%
|rowspan=3 |
|rowspan=3 |Andrea Johnson15,01130.38%
|rowspan=3 |
|rowspan=3 |Mackenzie Thomason2,9465.96%
|rowspan=3 |
|rowspan=3 |Jenica Atwin16,64033.68%
|rowspan=3 |
|rowspan=3 |Jason Paull7761.57%
|
|Brandon Kirby (Libert.)126 0.26%
|rowspan=3 |
|rowspan=3 |Matt DeCourcey
|-
|
|Jacob Patterson (Comm.)80 0.16%
|-
|
|Lesley Thomas (Animal)286 0.58%
|-
|rowspan=2 style="background-color:whitesmoke" |Fundy Royal
|rowspan=2 |
|rowspan=2 |Alaina Lockhart12,43325.56%
|rowspan=2 |
|rowspan=2 |Rob Moore22,38946.02%
|rowspan=2 |
|rowspan=2 |James Tolan4,8049.88%
|rowspan=2 |
|rowspan=2 |Tim Thompson7,27514.95%
|rowspan=2 |
|rowspan=2 |Rudy Neumayer1,2492.57%
|
|David Raymond Amos (Ind.)295 0.61%
|rowspan=2 |
|rowspan=2 |Alaina Lockhart
|-
|
|John Evans (NCA)201 0.41%
|-
| style="background-color:whitesmoke" |Madawaska—Restigouche
||
|René Arseneault17,33150.28%
|
|Nelson Fox9,80128.43%
|
|Chad Betteridge2,2126.42%
|
|Louis Bérubé5,12514.87%
|
|
|
|
||
|René Arseneault
|-
|rowspan=2 style="background-color:whitesmoke" |Miramichi—Grand Lake
|rowspan=2 |
|rowspan=2 |Pat Finnigan12,72236.77%
|rowspan=2 |
|rowspan=2 |Peggy McLean12,35235.70%
|rowspan=2 |
|rowspan=2 |Eileen Clancy Teslenko2,8758.31%
|rowspan=2 |
|rowspan=2 |Patty Deitch3,91411.31%
|rowspan=2 |
|rowspan=2 |Ron Nowlan1,1793.41%
|
|Mathew Grant Lawson (Ind.)396 1.14%
|rowspan=2 |
|rowspan=2 |Pat Finnigan
|-
|
|Allison MacKenzie (Ind.)1,160 3.35%
|-
| style="background-color:whitesmoke" |Moncton—Riverview—Dieppe
||
|Ginette Petitpas Taylor22,26142.95%
|
|Sylvie Godin-Charest12,20023.54%
|
|Luke MacLaren6,16411.89%
|
|Claire Kelly9,28717.92%
|
|Stephen Driver1,2582.43%
|
|Brad MacDonald (Animal)3730.72%Rhys Williams (CHP)2850.55%
||
|Ginette Petitpas Taylor
|-
| style="background-color:whitesmoke" |New Brunswick Southwest
|
|Karen Ludwig10,11025.54%
||
|John Williamson19,45149.15%
|
|Douglas Mullin3,2518.21%
|
|Susan Jonah5,35213.52%
|
|Meryl Sarty1,2143.07%
|
|Abe Scott (VCP)2000.51%
||
|Karen Ludwig
|-
|rowspan=2 style="background-color:whitesmoke" |Saint John—Rothesay
|rowspan=2 |
|rowspan=2 |Wayne Long15,44337.43%
|rowspan=2 |
|rowspan=2 |Rodney Weston14,00633.95%
|rowspan=2 |
|rowspan=2 |Armand Cormier5,04612.23%
|rowspan=2 |
|rowspan=2 |Ann McAllister4,16510.10%
|rowspan=2 |
|rowspan=2 |Adam J. C. Salesse1,2603.05%
|
|Neville Barnett (Ind.)150 0.36%
|rowspan=2 |
|rowspan=2 |Wayne Long
|-
|
|Stuart Jamieson (Ind.)1,183 2.87%
|-
| style="background-color:whitesmoke" |Tobique—Mactaquac
|
|Kelsey MacDonald9,63125.21%
||
|Richard Bragdon19,22950.34%
|
|Megan Aiken3,0077.87%
|
|Rowan P. Miller5,39814.13%
|
|Dominic Guay9362.45%
|
|
||
|T. J. Harvey†
|}<noinclude>

Quebec

Eastern Quebec

|-
| style="background-color:whitesmoke" |Avignon—La Mitis—Matane—Matapédia
|
|Rémi Massé12,18833.89%
|
|Natasha Tremblay2,7567.66%
||
|Kristina Michaud18,50051.43%
|
|Rémi-Jocelyn Côté1,4353.99%
|
|James Morrison6991.94%
|
|Éric Barnabé2100.58%
|
|Mathieu Castonguay (Rhino.)1800.50%
||
|Rémi Massé
|-
| style="background-color:whitesmoke" |Bellechasse—Les Etchemins—Lévis
|
|Laurence Harvey10,73416.66%
||
|Steven Blaney32,28350.09%
|
|Sébastien Bouchard-Théberge14,75422.89%
|
|Khuon Chamroeun3,2565.05%
|
|André Voyer1,9252.99%
|
|Marc Johnston1,3072.03%
|
|Yves Gilbert (CHP)1880.29%
||
|Steven Blaney
|-
| style="background-color:whitesmoke" |Gaspésie—Les Îles-de-la-Madeleine
||
|Diane Lebouthillier16,29642.46%
|
|Jean-Pierre Pigeon3,0227.87%
|
|Guy Bernatchez15,65940.80%
|
|Lynn Beaulieu1,7224.49%
|
|Dennis Drainville1,1302.94%
|
|Eric Hébert1980.52%
|
|Jay Cowboy (Rhino.)3530.92%
||
|Diane Lebouthillier
|-
| style="background-color:whitesmoke" |Montmagny—L'Islet—Kamouraska—Rivière-du-Loup
|
|Aladin Legault d'Auteuil8,21016.29%
||
|Bernard Généreux20,98941.65%
|
|Louis Gagnon16,26132.27%
|
|Hugo Latulippe3,4816.91%
|
|Denis Ducharme1,0302.04%
|
|Serge Haché4170.83%
|
|
||
|Bernard Généreux
|-
| style="background-color:whitesmoke" |Rimouski-Neigette—Témiscouata—Les Basques
|
|Chantal Pilon10,09522.06%
|
|Nancy Brassard-Fortin4,0738.90%
||
|Maxime Blanchette-Joncas17,31437.83%
|
|Guy Caron13,05028.51%
|
|Jocelyn Rioux8241.80%
|
|Pierre Lacombe2320.51%
|
|Lysane Picker-Paquin (Rhino.)1790.39%
||
|Guy Caron
|}<noinclude>

Côte-Nord and Saguenay

|-
| style="background-color:whitesmoke" |Beauport—Côte-de-Beaupré—Île d'Orléans—Charlevoix
|
|Manon Fortin10,60820.95%
|
|Sylvie Boucher15,04429.71%
||
|Caroline Desbiens18,40736.35%
|
|Gérard Briand2,8415.61%
|
|Richard Guertin1,3552.68%
|
|Jean-Claude Parent1,0452.06%
|
|Raymond Bernier (NA)1,3352.64%
||
|Sylvie Boucher
|-
| style="background-color:whitesmoke" |Chicoutimi—Le Fjord
|
|Dajana Dautovic7,50417.10%
||
|Richard Martel16,15536.82%
|
|Valérie Tremblay15,32134.91%
|
|Stéphane Girard2,8556.51%
|
|Lynda Youde1,3883.16%
|
|Jimmy Voyer3590.82%
|
|Line Bélanger (Rhino.)2990.68%
||
|Richard Martel
|-
| style="background-color:whitesmoke" |Jonquière
|
|Vincent Garneau7,84915.90%
|
|Philippe Gagnon10,33820.94%
||
|Mario Simard17,57735.60%
|
|Karine Trudel12,14124.59%
|
|Lyne Bourdages1,0092.04%
|
|Sylvie Théodore4530.92%
|
|
||
|Karine Trudel
|-
| style="background-color:whitesmoke" |Lac-Saint-Jean
|
|Richard Hébert13,63325.14%
|
|Jocelyn Fradette12,54423.13%
||
|Alexis Brunelle-Duceppe23,83943.96%
|
|Jean-Simon Fortin2,7535.08%
|
|Julie Gagnon-Bond1,0101.86%
|
|Danny Boudreault4480.83%
|
|
||
|Richard Hébert
|-
| style="background-color:whitesmoke" |Manicouagan
|
|Dave Savard7,79319.29%
|
|François Corriveau7,77119.24%
||
|Marilène Gill21,76853.89%
|
|Colleen McCool1,4823.67%
|
|Jacques Gélineau1,2933.20%
|
|Gabriel Côté2830.70%
|
|
||
|Marilène Gill
|}<noinclude>

Quebec City

|-
| style="background-color:whitesmoke" |Beauport—Limoilou
|
|Antoine Bujold13,02025.94%
|
|Alupa Clarke13,18526.27%
||
|Julie Vignola15,14930.18%
|
|Simon-Pierre Beaudet5,59911.16%
|
|Dalila Elhak2,1274.24%
|
|Alicia Bédard1,0332.06%
|
|Claude Moreau (M-L)780.16%
||
|Alupa Clarke
|-
| style="background-color:whitesmoke" |Charlesbourg—Haute-Saint-Charles
|
|René-Paul Coly12,58421.29%
||
|Pierre Paul-Hus22,48438.05%
|
|Alain D'Eer16,05327.16%
|
|Guillaume Bourdeau4,5547.71%
|
|Samuel Moisan-Domm2,0423.46%
|
|Joey Pronovost1,3792.33%
|
|
||
|Pierre Paul-Hus
|-
| style="background-color:whitesmoke" |Louis-Hébert
||
|Joël Lightbound25,14040.51%
|
|Marie-Josée Guérette10,91217.58%
|
|Christian Hébert17,37528.00%
|
|Jérémie Juneau4,8847.87%
|
|Macarena Diab2,4663.97%
|
|Daniel Brisson1,0161.64%
|
|Ali Dahan (Ind.)2670.43%
||
|Joël Lightbound
|-
| style="background-color:whitesmoke" |Louis-Saint-Laurent
|
|Jean-Christophe Cusson13,57120.70%
||
|Gérard Deltell29,27944.66%
|
|Jeanne-Paule Desgagnés14,67422.38%
|
|Colette Amram Ducharme4,3396.62%
|
|Sandra Mara Riedo2,1553.29%
|
|Guillaume Côté1,5432.35%
|
|
||
|Gérard Deltell
|-
|rowspan=2 style="background-color:whitesmoke" |Québec
|rowspan=2 |
|rowspan=2 |Jean-Yves Duclos18,04733.30%
|rowspan=2 |
|rowspan=2 |Bianca Boutin8,11814.98%
|rowspan=2 |
|rowspan=2 |Christiane Gagnon17,72232.70%
|rowspan=2 |
|rowspan=2 |Tommy Bureau6,22011.48%
|rowspan=2 |
|rowspan=2 |Luc Joli-Coeur2,9495.44%
|rowspan=2 |
|rowspan=2 |Bruno Dabiré6741.24%
|
|Sébastien CoRhino (Rhino.)349 0.64%
|rowspan=2 |
|rowspan=2 |Jean-Yves Duclos
|-
|
|Luc Paquin (PIQ)119 0.22%
|}<noinclude>

Central Quebec

|-
| style="background-color:whitesmoke" |Bécancour—Nicolet—Saurel
|
|Nathalie Rochefort9,33217.83%
|
|Pierre-André Émond8,43416.11%
||
|Louis Plamondon29,65356.66%
|
|Carole Lennard2,7325.22%
|
|David Turcotte1,6973.24%
|
|Richard Synnott4890.93%
|
|
||
|Louis Plamondon
|-
|rowspan=3 style="background-color:whitesmoke" |Berthier—Maskinongé
|rowspan=3 |
|rowspan=3 |Christine Poirier7,79613.83%
|rowspan=3 |
|rowspan=3 |Josée Bélanger5,81210.31%
|rowspan=3 |
|rowspan=3 |Yves Perron21,20037.62%
|rowspan=3 |
|rowspan=3 |Ruth Ellen Brosseau19,69834.95%
|rowspan=3 |
|rowspan=3 |Éric Laferrière1,0081.79%
|rowspan=3 |
|rowspan=3 |Luc Massé4280.76%
|
|Alain Bélanger (Ind.)154 0.27%
|rowspan=3 |
|rowspan=3 |Ruth Ellen Brosseau
|-
|
|Martin Acetaria Caesar Jubinville (Rhino.)151 0.27%
|-
|
|Danny Légaré (Mar.)107 0.19%
|-
| style="background-color:whitesmoke" |Joliette
|
|Michel Bourgeois12,99522.52%
|
|Jean-Martin Masse5,1768.97%
||
|Gabriel Ste-Marie33,59058.22%
|
|Julienne Soumaoro2,6234.55%
|
|Érica Poirier2,3434.06%
|
|Sylvain Prescott4980.86%
|
|Paul Savard (PIQ)4740.82%
||
|Gabriel Ste-Marie
|-
| style="background-color:whitesmoke" |Lévis—Lotbinière
|
|Ghislain Daigle10,76116.95%
||
|Jacques Gourde28,29744.57%
|
|François-Noël Brault15,92125.08%
|
|Christel Marchand4,3556.86%
|
|Patrick Kerr1,9083.01%
|
|Marc Fontaine2,2473.54%
|
|
||
|Jacques Gourde
|-
| style="background-color:whitesmoke" |Montcalm
|
|Isabel Sayegh11,20020.44%
|
|Gisèle Desroches4,9429.02%
||
|Luc Thériault31,79158.01%
|
|Julian Bonello-Stauch3,5146.41%
|
|Mathieu Goyette2,4164.41%
|
|Hugo Clénin5240.96%
|
|Marc Labelle (PIQ)4190.76%
||
|Luc Thériault
|-
| style="background-color:whitesmoke" |Portneuf—Jacques-Cartier
|
|Annie Talbot12,87619.91%
||
|Joël Godin28,11043.46%
|
|Mathieu Bonsaint15,70724.29%
|
|David-Roger Gagnon3,7585.81%
|
|Marie-Claude Gaudet2,3083.57%
|
|Luca Abbatiello1,9152.96%
|
|
||
|Joël Godin
|-
| style="background-color:whitesmoke" |Repentigny
|
|Josée Larose18,11127.67%
|
|Pierre Branchaud4,8787.45%
||
|Monique Pauzé34,83753.22%
|
|Meryem Benslimane4,4706.83%
|
|Diane Beauregard2,2893.50%
|
|Samuel Saint-Laurent5240.80%
|
|Micheline Boucher Granger (PIQ)3470.53%
||
|Monique Pauzé
|-
| style="background-color:whitesmoke" |Saint-Maurice—Champlain
||
|François-Philippe Champagne23,10439.55%
|
|Bruno-Pier Courchesne9,54216.34%
|
|Nicole Morin19,95034.15%
|
|Barthélémy Boisguérin3,0715.26%
|
|Stéphanie Dufresne1,8093.10%
|
|Julie Déziel9381.61%
|
|
||
|François-Philippe Champagne
|-
| style="background-color:whitesmoke" |Trois-Rivières
|
|Valérie Renaud-Martin15,77426.06%
|
|Yves Lévesque15,24025.17%
||
|Louise Charbonneau17,24028.48%
|
|Robert Aubin10,09016.67%
|
|Marie Duplessis1,4922.46%
|
|Marc André Gingras5650.93%
|
|Ronald St-Onge Lynch (Ind.)1370.23%
||
|Robert Aubin
|}<noinclude>

Eastern Townships

|-
| style="background-color:whitesmoke" |Beauce
|
|Adam Veilleux6,97111.73%
||
|Richard Lehoux22,86038.47%
|
|Guillaume Rodrigue8,41014.15%
|
|François Jacques-Côté1,8473.11%
|
|Josiane Fortin1,4612.46%
|
|Maxime Bernier16,79628.26%
|
|Maxime Bernier1,0841.82%
|
|
||
|Maxime Bernier
|-
| style="background-color:whitesmoke" |Brome—Missisquoi
||
|Lyne Bessette23,45038.17%
|
|Bruno Côté7,69712.53%
|
|Monique Allard21,15234.43%
|
|Sylvie Jetté4,8877.95%
|
|Normand Dallaire3,3025.37%
|
|François Poulin4560.74%
|
|Steeve Cloutier3100.50%
|
|Lawrence Cotton (VCP)1870.30%
||
|Denis Paradis†$
|-
| style="background-color:whitesmoke" |Compton—Stanstead
||
|Marie-Claude Bibeau21,73137.31%
|
|Jessy Mc Neil8,44614.50%
|
|David Benoît18,57131.89%
|
|Naomie Mathieu Chauvette5,6079.63%
|
|Jean Rousseau3,0445.23%
|
|Paul Reed5861.01%
|
|Jonathan Therrien2520.43%
|
|
||
|Marie-Claude Bibeau
|-
| style="background-color:whitesmoke" |Drummond
|
|William Morales9,55217.42%
|
|Jessica Ebacher9,08316.57%
||
|Martin Champoux24,57444.82%
|
|François Choquette8,71615.90%
|
|Frédérik Bernier1,8563.39%
|
|Steeve Paquet5250.96%
|
|Réal Batrhino2700.49%
|
|Lucas Munger (Animal)2480.45%
||
|François Choquette
|-
| style="background-color:whitesmoke" |Mégantic—L'Érable
|
|Isabelle Grégoire7,38815.55%
||
|Luc Berthold23,39249.24%
|
|Priscilla Corbeil12,24925.78%
|
|Mathieu Boisvert1,9364.08%
|
|Nicole Charette1,2582.65%
|
|Marie Claude Lauzier8121.71%
|
|Damien Roy2560.54%
|
|Jean Paradis (Ind.)2170.46%
||
|Luc Berthold
|-
| style="background-color:whitesmoke" |Richmond—Arthabaska
|
|Marc Patry8,86815.12%
||
|Alain Rayes26,55345.28%
|
|Olivier Nolin16,53928.21%
|
|Olivier Guérin2,8644.88%
|
|Laura Horth-Lepage3,1335.34%
|
|Jean Landry6811.16%
|
|
|
|
||
|Alain Rayes
|-
| style="background-color:whitesmoke" |Saint-Hyacinthe—Bagot
|
|René Vincelette11,90321.29%
|
|Bernard Barré8,06214.42%
||
|Simon-Pierre Savard-Tremblay23,14341.39%
|
|Brigitte Sansoucy10,29718.42%
|
|Sabrina Huet-Côté2,0313.63%
|
|Jean-François Bélanger4780.85%
|
|
|
|
||
|Brigitte Sansoucy
|-
| style="background-color:whitesmoke" |Shefford
|
|Pierre Breton22,60537.11%
|
|Nathalie Clermont7,49512.30%
||
|Andréanne Larouche23,50338.58%
|
|Raymonde Plamondon3,7056.08%
|
|Katherine Turgeon2,8144.62%
|
|Mariam Sabbagh4970.82%
|
|
|
|Darlène Daviault (PIQ)2940.48%
||
|Pierre Breton
|-
|rowspan=2 style="background-color:whitesmoke" |Sherbrooke
|rowspan=2 |
|rowspan=2 |Élisabeth Brière17,49029.28%
|rowspan=2 |
|rowspan=2 |Dany Sévigny6,36210.65%
|rowspan=2 |
|rowspan=2 |Claude Forgues15,47025.90%
|rowspan=2 |
|rowspan=2 |Pierre-Luc Dusseault16,88128.26%
|rowspan=2 |
|rowspan=2 |Mathieu Morin2,7164.55%
|rowspan=2 |
|rowspan=2 |
|rowspan=2 |
|rowspan=2 |Steve Côté2190.37%
|
|Edwin Moreno (Ind.)471 0.79%
|rowspan=2 |
|rowspan=2 |Pierre-Luc Dusseault
|-
|
|Hubert Richard (NA)117 0.20%
|}<noinclude>

Montérégie

|-
| style="background-color:whitesmoke" |Beloeil—Chambly
|
|Marie-Chantal Hamel16,05923.11%
|
|Véronique Laprise4,3056.20%
||
|Yves-François Blanchet35,06850.46%
|
|Matthew Dubé10,08614.51%
|
|Pierre Carrier3,2554.68%
|
|Chloé Bernard5120.74%
|
|Michel Blondin (PIQ)2050.30%
||
|Matthew Dubé
|-
| style="background-color:whitesmoke" |Brossard—Saint-Lambert
||
|Alexandra Mendès30,53753.90%
|
|Glenn Hoa6,11210.79%
|
|Marie-Claude Diotte11,13119.65%
|
|Marc Audet5,4109.55%
|
|Grégory De Luca2,9355.18%
|
|Sam Nassif5270.93%
|
|
||
|Alexandra Mendès
|-
|rowspan=2 style="background-color:whitesmoke" |Châteauguay—Lacolle
|rowspan=2 |
|rowspan=2 |Brenda Shanahan20,11838.39%
|rowspan=2 |
|rowspan=2 |Hugues Laplante5,85111.17%
|rowspan=2 |
|rowspan=2 |Claudia Valdivia19,47937.17%
|rowspan=2 |
|rowspan=2 |Marika Lalime4,0057.64%
|rowspan=2 |
|rowspan=2 |Meryam Haddad1,9293.68%
|rowspan=2 |
|rowspan=2 |Jeff Benoit5631.07%
|
|Pierre Chénier (M-L)64 0.12%
|rowspan=2 |
|rowspan=2 |Brenda Shanahan
|-
|
|Marc Gagnon (PIQ)393 0.75%
|-
| style="background-color:whitesmoke" |La Prairie
|
|Jean-Claude Poissant22,50436.56%
|
|Isabelle Lapointe5,5409.00%
||
|Alain Therrien25,70741.76%
|
|Victoria Hernandez4,7447.71%
|
|Barbara Joannette2,5654.17%
|
|Gregory Yablunovsky3930.64%
|
|Normand Chouinard (M-L)1000.16%
||
|Jean-Claude Poissant
|-
| style="background-color:whitesmoke" |Longueuil—Charles-LeMoyne
||
|Sherry Romanado20,11439.02%
|
|Stéphane Robichaud3,8117.39%
|
|Cathy Lepage18,79436.46%
|
|Kalden Dhatsenpa5,28910.26%
|
|Casandra Poitras2,9785.78%
|
|Henri Cousineau5581.08%
|
|
||
|Sherry Romanado
|-
| style="background-color:whitesmoke" |Longueuil—Saint-Hubert
|
|Réjean Hébert20,47134.21%
|
|Patrick Clune3,7796.31%
||
|Denis Trudel23,06138.54%
|
|Éric Ferland5,1048.53%
|
|Pierre Nantel6,74511.27%
|
|Ellen Comeau4670.78%
|
|Pierre-Luc Filion (Ind.)2170.36%
||
|Pierre Nantel
|-
| style="background-color:whitesmoke" |Montarville
|
|Michel Picard21,06135.56%
|
|Julie Sauvageau4,1386.99%
||
|Stéphane Bergeron25,36642.83%
|
|Djaouida Sellah4,9848.41%
|
|Jean-Charles Pelland2,9675.01%
|
|Julie Lavallée5010.85%
|
|Thomas Thibault-Vincent (Rhino.)2110.35%
||
|Michel Picard (politician)|Michel Picard
|-
| style="background-color:whitesmoke" |Pierre-Boucher—Les Patriotes—Verchères
|
|Simon Chalifoux17,33328.52%
|
|Mathieu Daviault4,9108.08%
||
|Xavier Barsalou-Duval31,00951.02%
|
|Sean English4,1926.90%
|
|Dany Gariépy2,9554.86%
|
|Clifford Albert3840.63%
|
|
||
|Xavier Barsalou-Duval
|-
| style="background-color:whitesmoke" |Saint-Jean
|
|Jean Rioux18,90630.56%
|
|Martin Thibert6,61210.69%
||
|Christine Normandin27,75044.85%
|
|Chantal Reeves4,7947.75%
|
|André-Philippe Chenail3,1275.05%
|
|Marc Hivon3970.64%
|
|Yvon Savary (PIQ)2890.47%
||
|Jean Rioux
|-
| style="background-color:whitesmoke" |Salaberry—Suroît
|
|Marc Faubert18,68229.70%
|
|Cynthia Larivière6,1169.72%
||
|Claude DeBellefeuille29,97547.65%
|
|Joan Gottman5,0247.99%
|
|Nahed AlShawa1,9973.17%
|
|Alain Savard7671.22%
|
|Luc Bertrand (PIQ)3420.54%
||
|Anne Minh-Thu Quach†
|-
| style="background-color:whitesmoke" |Vaudreuil—Soulanges
||
|Peter Schiefke32,25447.33%
|
|Karen Cox7,80411.45%
|
|Noémie Rouillard16,60024.36%
|
|Amanda MacDonald7,36810.81%
|
|Cameron Stiff3,4055.00%
|
|Kaylin Tam7111.04%
|
|
||
|Peter Schiefke
|}<noinclude>

Eastern Montreal

|-
|rowspan=2 style="background-color:whitesmoke" |Hochelaga
|rowspan=2 |
|rowspan=2 |Soraya Martinez Ferrada18,00833.95%
|rowspan=2 |
|rowspan=2 |Christine Marcoux2,3814.49%
|rowspan=2 |
|rowspan=2 |Simon Marchand17,68033.34%
|rowspan=2 |
|rowspan=2 |Catheryn Roy-Goyette11,45121.59%
|rowspan=2 |
|rowspan=2 |Robert D. Morais2,6184.94%
|rowspan=2 |
|rowspan=2 |Stepan Balatsko3770.71%
|rowspan=2 |
|rowspan=2 |Christine Dandenault1070.20%
|
|Chinook Blais-Leduc (Rhino.)314 0.59%
|rowspan=2 |
|rowspan=2 |Marjolaine Boutin-Sweet†
|-
|
|JP Fortin (Comm.)101 0.19%
|-
| style="background-color:whitesmoke" |Honoré-Mercier
||
|Pablo Rodríguez29,54358.66%
|
|Guy Croteau4,8089.55%
|
|Jacques Binette9,97919.81%
|
|Chu Anh Pham4,1308.20%
|
|Domenico Cusmano1,3732.73%
|
|Patrick St-Onge4590.91%
|
|Yves Le Seigle710.14%
|
|
||
|Pablo Rodríguez
|-
| style="background-color:whitesmoke" |La Pointe-de-l'Île
|
|Jonathan Plamondon16,89830.43%
|
|Robert Coutu3,9847.17%
||
|Mario Beaulieu26,01046.84%
|
|Ève Péclet6,05710.91%
|
|Franco Fiori1,9103.44%
|
|Randy Manseau3880.70%
|
|Geneviève Royer880.16%
|
|Jacinthe Lafrenaye (PIQ)1990.36%
||
|Mario Beaulieu
|-
|rowspan=3 style="background-color:whitesmoke" |Laurier—Sainte-Marie
|rowspan=3 |
|rowspan=3 |Steven Guilbeault22,30641.76%
|rowspan=3 |
|rowspan=3 |Lise des Greniers1,5022.81%
|rowspan=3 |
|rowspan=3 |Michel Duchesne12,18822.82%
|rowspan=3 |
|rowspan=3 |Nimâ Machouf13,45325.19%
|rowspan=3 |
|rowspan=3 |Jamil Azzaoui3,2256.04%
|rowspan=3 |
|rowspan=3 |Christine Bui3200.60%
|rowspan=3 |
|rowspan=3 |Serge Lachapelle980.18%
|
|Archie Morals (Rhino.)208 0.39%
|rowspan=3 |
|rowspan=3 |Hélène Laverdière†
|-
|
|Dimitri Mourkes (Ind.)42 0.08%
|-
|
|Adrien Welsh (Comm.)67 0.13%
|-
|rowspan=2 style="background-color:whitesmoke" |Rosemont—La Petite-Patrie
|rowspan=2 |
|rowspan=2 |Geneviève Hinse14,57624.21%
|rowspan=2 |
|rowspan=2 |Johanna Sarfati1,4052.33%
|rowspan=2 |
|rowspan=2 |Claude André14,30623.76%
|rowspan=2 |
|rowspan=2 |Alexandre Boulerice25,57542.48%
|rowspan=2 |
|rowspan=2 |Jean Désy3,5395.88%
|rowspan=2 |
|rowspan=2 |Bobby Pellerin2930.49%
|rowspan=2 |
|rowspan=2 |Gisèle Desrochers800.13%
|
|Jos Guitare Lavoie (Rhino.)346 0.57%
|rowspan=2 |
|rowspan=2 |Alexandre Boulerice
|-
|
|Normand Raymond (Comm.)86 0.14%
|}<noinclude>

Western Montreal

|-
|rowspan=2 style="background-color:whitesmoke" |Dorval—Lachine—LaSalle
|rowspan=2 |
|rowspan=2 |Anju Dhillon27,82152.92%
|rowspan=2 |
|rowspan=2 |Céline Laquerre5,54310.54%
|rowspan=2 |
|rowspan=2 |Jean-Frédéric Vaudry8,97417.07%
|rowspan=2 |
|rowspan=2 |Lori Morrison6,20711.81%
|rowspan=2 |
|rowspan=2 |Réjean Malette2,8985.51%
|rowspan=2 |
|rowspan=2 |Arash Torbati5281.00%
|rowspan=2 |
|rowspan=2 |
|
|Fang Hu (PC)426 0.81%
|rowspan=2 |
|rowspan=2 |Anju Dhillon
|-
|
|Xavier Watso (Rhino.)177 0.34%
|-
|rowspan=2 style="background-color:whitesmoke" |Lac-Saint-Louis
|rowspan=2 |
|rowspan=2 |Francis Scarpaleggia34,62258.16%
|rowspan=2 |
|rowspan=2 |Ann Francis9,08315.26%
|rowspan=2 |
|rowspan=2 |Julie Benoît3,1695.32%
|rowspan=2 |
|rowspan=2 |Dana Chevalier7,26312.20%
|rowspan=2 |
|rowspan=2 |Milan Kona-Mancini4,1767.02%
|rowspan=2 |
|rowspan=2 |Gary Charles8051.35%
|rowspan=2 |
|rowspan=2 |
|
|Ralston Coelho (CNP)28 0.05%
|rowspan=2 |
|rowspan=2 |Francis Scarpaleggia
|-
|
|Victoria de Martigny (Animal)379 0.64%
|-
|rowspan=2 style="background-color:whitesmoke" |LaSalle—Émard—Verdun
|rowspan=2 |
|rowspan=2 |David Lametti22,80343.52%
|rowspan=2 |
|rowspan=2 |Claudio Rocchi3,6907.04%
|rowspan=2 |
|rowspan=2 |Isabel Dion12,61924.09%
|rowspan=2 |
|rowspan=2 |Steven Scott8,62816.47%
|rowspan=2 |
|rowspan=2 |Jency Mercier3,5836.84%
|rowspan=2 |
|rowspan=2 |Daniel Turgeon4900.94%
|rowspan=2 |
|rowspan=2 |Eileen Studd390.07%
|
|Rhino Jacques Bélanger (Rhino.)265 0.51%
|rowspan=2 |
|rowspan=2 |David Lametti
|-
|
|Julien Côté (Ind.)274 0.52%
|-
| style="background-color:whitesmoke" |Mount Royal
||
|Anthony Housefather24,59056.30%
|
|David Tordjman10,88724.93%
|
|Xavier Levesque1,7574.02%
|
|Eric-Abel Baland3,6098.26%
|
|Clément Badra2,3895.47%
|
|Zachary Lozoff3620.83%
|
|Diane Johnston850.19%
|
|
||
|Anthony Housefather
|-
| style="background-color:whitesmoke" |Notre-Dame-de-Grâce—Westmount
||
|Marc Garneau28,32356.28%
|
|Neil Drabkin5,75911.44%
|
|Jennifer Jetté2,3594.69%
|
|Franklin Gertler7,75315.41%
|
|Robert Green5,39710.73%
|
|André Valiquette5651.12%
|
|Rachel Hoffman670.13%
|
|Jeffery A. Thomas (Ind.)980.19%
||
|Marc Garneau
|-
| style="background-color:whitesmoke" |Outremont
||
|Rachel Bendayan19,14846.19%
|
|Jasmine Louras2,7076.53%
|
|Célia Grimard5,74113.85%
|
|Andrea Clarke8,31920.07%
|
|Daniel Green5,01812.10%
|
|Sabin Lévesque3690.89%
|
|
|
|Mark John Hiemstra (Rhino.)1550.37%
||
|Rachel Bendayan
|-
|rowspan=2 style="background-color:whitesmoke" |Pierrefonds—Dollard
|rowspan=2 |
|rowspan=2 |Sameer Zuberi31,30556.43%
|rowspan=2 |
|rowspan=2 |Mariam Ishak9,79717.66%
|rowspan=2 |
|rowspan=2 |Edline Henri4,4698.06%
|rowspan=2 |
|rowspan=2 |Bruno Ibrahim El-Khoury5,68710.25%
|rowspan=2 |
|rowspan=2 |Lisa Mintz2,8665.17%
|rowspan=2 |
|rowspan=2 |Lee Weishar7111.28%
|rowspan=2 |
|rowspan=2 |
|
|Shahid Khan (Ind.)242 0.44%
|rowspan=2 |
|rowspan=2 |Frank Baylis†$
|-
|
|Martin Plante (Ind.)394 0.71%
|-
| style="background-color:whitesmoke" |Saint-Laurent
||
|Emmanuella Lambropoulos23,52758.60%
|
|Richard Serour7,00517.45%
|
|Thérèse Miljours2,8457.09%
|
|Miranda Gallo4,06510.13%
|
|Georgia Kokotsis2,1505.36%
|
|Christopher Mikus4841.21%
|
|Ginette Boutet710.18%
|
|
||
|Emmanuella Lambropoulos
|-
|rowspan=3 style="background-color:whitesmoke" |Ville-Marie—Le Sud-Ouest—Île-des-Sœurs
|rowspan=3 |
|rowspan=3 |Marc Miller28,08753.48%
|rowspan=3 |
|rowspan=3 |Michael Forian4,6098.78%
|rowspan=3 |
|rowspan=3 |Nadia Bourque6,89913.14%
|rowspan=3 |
|rowspan=3 |Sophie Thiébaut8,27415.75%
|rowspan=3 |
|rowspan=3 |Liana Canton Cusmano3,7187.08%
|rowspan=3 |
|rowspan=3 |Jean Langlais5200.99%
|rowspan=3 |
|rowspan=3 |Linda Sullivan450.09%
|
|Tommy Gaudet (Rhino.)140 0.27%
|rowspan=3 |
|rowspan=3 |Marc Miller
|-
|
|Louise B. O'Sullivan (Ind.)117 0.22%
|-
|
|Marc Patenaude (NA)113 0.22%
|}<noinclude>

Northern Montreal and Laval

|-
| style="background-color:whitesmoke" |Ahuntsic-Cartierville
||
|Mélanie Joly28,90452.45%
|
|Kathy Laframboise4,0137.28%
|
|André Parizeau11,97421.73%
|
|Zahia El-Masri6,28411.40%
|
|Jean-Michel Lavarenne3,3526.08%
|
|Raymond Ayas5841.06%
|
|
||
|Mélanie Joly
|-
|rowspan=2 style="background-color:whitesmoke" |Alfred-Pellan
|rowspan=2 |
|rowspan=2 |Angelo Iacono26,01547.90%
|rowspan=2 |
|rowspan=2 |Angelo Esposito5,91710.90%
|rowspan=2 |
|rowspan=2 |Michel Lachance15,54928.63%
|rowspan=2 |
|rowspan=2 |Andriana Kocini4,1097.57%
|rowspan=2 |
|rowspan=2 |Marguerite Howells1,9583.61%
|rowspan=2 |
|rowspan=2 |Matthieu Couture4710.87%
|
|Julius Buté (PIQ)177 0.33%
|rowspan=2 |
|rowspan=2 |Angelo Iacono
|-
|
|Dwayne Cappelletti (Ind.)113 0.21%
|-
|rowspan=2 style="background-color:whitesmoke" |Bourassa
|rowspan=2 |
|rowspan=2 |Emmanuel Dubourg23,23157.57%
|rowspan=2 |
|rowspan=2 |Catherine Lefebvre2,8997.18%
|rowspan=2 |
|rowspan=2 |Anne-Marie Lavoie9,04322.41%
|rowspan=2 |
|rowspan=2 |Konrad Lamour3,2047.94%
|rowspan=2 |
|rowspan=2 |Payton Ashe1,3433.33%
|rowspan=2 |
|rowspan=2 |Louis Léger3470.86%
|
|Joseph Di Iorio (Ind.)212 0.53%
|rowspan=2 |
|rowspan=2 |Emmanuel Dubourg
|-
|
|Françoise Roy (M-L)72 0.18%
|-
| style="background-color:whitesmoke" |Laval—Les Îles
||
|Fayçal El-Khoury26,03148.24%
|
|Tom Pentefountas8,81616.34%
|
|Nacera Beddad11,12020.61%
|
|Noémia Onofre De Lima4,8038.90%
|
|Sari Madi2,3064.27%
|
|Marie-Louise Beauchamp8851.64%
|
|
||
|Fayçal El-Khoury
|-
| style="background-color:whitesmoke" |Marc-Aurèle-Fortin
||
|Yves Robillard24,86544.55%
|
|Sonia Baudelot5,4239.72%
|
|Lizabel Nitoi18,06932.37%
|
|Ali Faour4,7418.49%
|
|Bao Tran Le2,1113.78%
|
|Emilio Migliozzi4650.83%
|
|Elias Progakis (Ind.)1430.26%
||
|Yves Robillard
|-
|rowspan=5 style="background-color:whitesmoke" |Papineau
|rowspan=5 |
|rowspan=5 |Justin Trudeau25,95751.12%
|rowspan=5 |
|rowspan=5 |Sophie Veilleux2,1554.24%
|rowspan=5 |
|rowspan=5 |Christian Gagnon8,12416.00%
|rowspan=5 |
|rowspan=5 |Christine Paré9,74819.20%
|rowspan=5 |
|rowspan=5 |Juan Vazquez3,7417.37%
|rowspan=5 |
|rowspan=5 |Mark Sibthorpe3220.63%
|
|Jean-Patrick Cacereco Berthiaume (Rhino.)363 0.71%
|rowspan=5 |
|rowspan=5 |Justin Trudeau
|-
|
|Susanne Lefebvre (CHP)186 0.37%
|-
|
|Luc Lupien (NA)75 0.15%
|-
|
|Alain Magnan (Ind.)76 0.16%
|-
|
|Steve Penner (NA)34 0.07%
|-
|rowspan=2 style="background-color:whitesmoke" |Saint-Léonard—Saint-Michel
|rowspan=2 |
|rowspan=2 |Patricia Lattanzio27,86661.33%
|rowspan=2 |
|rowspan=2 |Ilario Maiolo5,42311.94%
|rowspan=2 |
|rowspan=2 |Dominique Mougin4,3519.58%
|rowspan=2 |
|rowspan=2 |Paulina Ayala2,9646.52%
|rowspan=2 |
|rowspan=2 |Alessandra Szilagyi1,1832.60%
|rowspan=2 |
|rowspan=2 |Tina Di Serio5011.10%
|
|Garnet Colly (M-L)85 0.19%
|rowspan=2 |
|rowspan=2 |vacant
|-
|
|Hassan Guillet (Ind.)3,061 6.74%
|-
| style="background-color:whitesmoke" |Vimy
||
|Annie Koutrakis26,49047.70%
|
|Rima El-Helou5,95110.72%
|
|Claire-Emmanuelle Beaulieu15,45527.83%
|
|Vassif Aliev4,7798.61%
|
|Faiza R'Guiba2,1253.83%
|
|Suzanne Brunelle7331.32%
|
|
||
|Eva Nassif†
|}<noinclude>

Laurentides, Outaouais and Northern Quebec

|-
| style="background-color:whitesmoke" |Abitibi—Baie-James—Nunavik—Eeyou
|
|Isabelle Bergeron8,96328.31%
|
|Martin Ferron5,24016.55%
||
|Sylvie Bérubé11,43236.11%
|
|Jacline Rouleau4,10412.96%
|
|Kiara Cabana-Whiteley1,1513.64%
|
|Guillaume Lanouette3791.20%
|
|Daniel Simon (Mar.)3871.22%
||
|Romeo Saganash†
|-
| style="background-color:whitesmoke" |Abitibi—Témiscamingue
|
|Claude Thibault12,41724.76%
|
|Mario Provencher7,53715.03%
||
|Sébastien Lemire22,80345.47%
|
|Alain Guimond5,09310.15%
|
|Aline Bégin1,8183.62%
|
|Jacques Girard4870.97%
|
|
||
|Christine Moore†
|-
| style="background-color:whitesmoke" |Argenteuil—La Petite-Nation
||
|Stéphane Lauzon18,89637.79%
|
|Marie Louis-Seize6,04412.09%
|
|Yves Destroismaisons18,16736.34%
|
|Charlotte Boucher Smoley3,7587.52%
|
|Marjorie Valiquette2,4114.82%
|
|Sherwin Edwards7211.44%
|
|
||
|Stéphane Lauzon
|-
| style="background-color:whitesmoke" |Gatineau
||
|Steven MacKinnon29,08452.14%
|
|Sylvie Goneau5,74510.30%
|
|Geneviève Nadeau11,92621.38%
|
|Eric Chaurette6,12810.99%
|
|Guy Dostaler2,2644.06%
|
|Mario-Roberto Lam5601.00%
|
|Pierre Soublière (M-L)760.14%
||
|Steven MacKinnon
|-
|rowspan=2 style="background-color:whitesmoke" |Hull—Aylmer
|rowspan=2 |
|rowspan=2 |Greg Fergus29,73254.07%
|rowspan=2 |
|rowspan=2 |Mike Duggan4,9799.05%
|rowspan=2 |
|rowspan=2 |Joanie Riopel8,01114.57%
|rowspan=2 |
|rowspan=2 |Nicolas Thibodeau7,46713.58%
|rowspan=2 |
|rowspan=2 |Josée Poirier Defoy3,8697.04%
|rowspan=2 |
|rowspan=2 |Rowen Tanguay6381.16%
|
|Alexandre Deschênes (M-L)102 0.19%
|rowspan=2 |
|rowspan=2 |Greg Fergus
|-
|
|Sébastien Grenier (Rhino.)195 0.35%
|-
|rowspan=2 style="background-color:whitesmoke" |Laurentides—Labelle
|rowspan=2 |
|rowspan=2 |David Graham21,65533.11%
|rowspan=2 |
|rowspan=2 |Serge Grégoire4,9837.62%
|rowspan=2 |
|rowspan=2 |Marie-Hélène Gaudreau30,62546.82%
|rowspan=2 |
|rowspan=2 |Claude Dufour4,1226.30%
|rowspan=2 |
|rowspan=2 |Gaël Chantrel3,1574.83%
|rowspan=2 |
|rowspan=2 |Richard Evanko4180.64%
|
|Michel Leclerc (Ind.)174 0.27%
|rowspan=2 |
|rowspan=2 |David de Burgh Graham|David Graham
|-
|
|Ludovic Schneider (Rhino.)272 0.42%
|-
| style="background-color:whitesmoke" |Mirabel
|
|Karl Trudel16,16224.85%
|
|François Desrochers5,9409.13%
||
|Simon Marcil33,21951.08%
|
|Anne-Marie Saint-Germain5,2198.03%
|
|Julie Tremblay3,5175.41%
|
|Christian Montpetit6410.99%
|
|Pietro Biacchi (PIQ)3320.51%
||
|Simon Marcil
|-
|rowspan=2 style="background-color:whitesmoke" |Pontiac
|rowspan=2 |
|rowspan=2 |William Amos30,21748.86%
|rowspan=2 |
|rowspan=2 |Dave Blackburn10,41616.84%
|rowspan=2 |
|rowspan=2 |Jonathan Carreiro-Benoit9,92916.05%
|rowspan=2 |
|rowspan=2 |Denise Giroux6,50310.51%
|rowspan=2 |
|rowspan=2 |Claude Bertrand3,7626.08%
|rowspan=2 |
|rowspan=2 |Mario Belec7751.25%
|
|Louis Lang (M-L)51 0.08%
|rowspan=2 |
|rowspan=2 |Will Amos
|-
|
|Shawn Stewart (VCP)194 0.31%
|-
| style="background-color:whitesmoke" |Rivière-des-Mille-Îles
|
|Linda Lapointe21,00936.11%
|
|Maikel Mikhael4,6848.05%
||
|Luc Desilets23,62940.61%
|
|Joseph Hakizimana5,0028.60%
|
|Ceylan Borgers3,0155.18%
|
|Hans Roker Jr8451.45%
|
|
||
|Linda Lapointe
|-
|rowspan=2 style="background-color:whitesmoke" |Rivière-du-Nord
|rowspan=2 |
|rowspan=2 |Florence Gagnon13,40222.30%
|rowspan=2 |
|rowspan=2 |Sylvie Fréchette7,12011.85%
|rowspan=2 |
|rowspan=2 |Rhéal Fortin31,28152.05%
|rowspan=2 |
|rowspan=2 |Myriam Ouellette4,1946.98%
|rowspan=2 |
|rowspan=2 |Joey Leckman3,3455.57%
|rowspan=2 |
|rowspan=2 |Normand Michaud4070.68%
|
|Nicolas Riqueur-Lainé (PIQ)225 0.37%
|rowspan=2 |
|rowspan=2 |Rhéal Fortin
|-
|
|Lucie St-Gelais (Ind.)127 0.21%
|-
|rowspan=2 style="background-color:whitesmoke" |Terrebonne
|rowspan=2 |
|rowspan=2 |Frédéric Beauchemin17,94429.26%
|rowspan=2 |
|rowspan=2 |France Gagnon4,6407.57%
|rowspan=2 |
|rowspan=2 |Michel Boudrias31,02950.59%
|rowspan=2 |
|rowspan=2 |Maxime Beaudoin4,6277.54%
|rowspan=2 |
|rowspan=2 |Réjean Monette2,2773.71%
|rowspan=2 |
|rowspan=2 |Jeffrey Barnes3990.65%
|
|Jade Hébert (Ind.)159 0.28%
|rowspan=2 |
|rowspan=2 |Michel Boudrias
|-
|
|Paul Vézina (Rhino.)260 0.42%
|-
|rowspan=2 style="background-color:whitesmoke" |Thérèse-De Blainville
|rowspan=2 |
|rowspan=2 |Ramez Ayoub20,98835.85%
|rowspan=2 |
|rowspan=2 |Marie Claude Fournier5,2648.99%
|rowspan=2 |
|rowspan=2 |Louise Chabot24,48641.82%
|rowspan=2 |
|rowspan=2 |Hannah Wolker4,4317.57%
|rowspan=2 |
|rowspan=2 |Normand Beaudet2,7104.63%
|rowspan=2 |
|rowspan=2 |Désiré Mounanga3660.63%
|
|Alain Lamontagne (Rhino.)215 0.37%
|rowspan=2 |
|rowspan=2 |Ramez Ayoub
|-
|
|Andy Piano (Ind.)89 0.15%
|}<noinclude>

Ontario

Ottawa

|-
| style="background-color:whitesmoke" |Carleton
|
|Chris Rodgers26,51838.23%
||
|Pierre Poilievre32,14746.35%
|
|Kevin Hua6,4799.34%
|
|Gordon Kubanek3,4234.94%
|
|Alain Musende7921.14%
|
|
|
|
||
|Pierre Poilievre
|-
| style="background-color:whitesmoke" |Kanata—Carleton
||
|Karen McCrimmon28,74643.05%
|
|Justina McCaffrey24,36136.48%
|
|Melissa Coenraad8,31712.46%
|
|Jennifer Purdy4,3876.57%
|
|Scott Miller9611.44%
|
|
|
|
||
|Karen McCrimmon
|-
| style="background-color:whitesmoke" |Nepean
||
|Chandra Arya31,93345.89%
|
|Brian St. Louis23,32033.51%
|
|Zaff Ansari9,10413.08%
|
|Jean-Luc Cooke4,3796.29%
|
|Azim Hooda6870.99%
|
|Dustan Wang1600.23%
|
|
||
|Chandra Arya
|-
| style="background-color:whitesmoke" |Orléans
||
|Marie-France Lalonde44,18354.27%
|
|David Bertschi22,98428.23%
|
|Jacqui Wiens9,42811.58%
|
|Michelle Petersen3,8294.70%
|
|Roger Saint-Fleur9861.21%
|
|
|
|
||
|Andrew Leslie†$
|-
|rowspan=5 style="background-color:whitesmoke" |Ottawa Centre
|rowspan=5 |
|rowspan=5 |Catherine McKenna38,39148.66%
|rowspan=5 |
|rowspan=5 |Carol Clemenhagen9,92012.57%
|rowspan=5 |
|rowspan=5 |Emilie Taman22,91629.04%
|rowspan=5 |
|rowspan=5 |Angela Keller-Herzog5,8377.40%
|rowspan=5 |
|rowspan=5 |Merylee Sevilla7200.91%
|rowspan=5 |
|rowspan=5 |Stuart Ryan1110.14%
|
|Shelby Bertrand (Animal)207 0.26%
|rowspan=5 |
|rowspan=5 |Catherine McKenna
|-
|
|Coreen Corcoran (Libert.)360 0.46%
|-
|
|Chris G Jones (Ind.)177 0.22%
|-
|
|Marie-Chantal Leriche (CHP)198 0.25%
|-
|
|Giang Ha Thu Vo (Ind.)65 0.08%
|-
|rowspan=2 style="background-color:whitesmoke" |Ottawa South
|rowspan=2 |
|rowspan=2 |David McGuinty34,20552.32%
|rowspan=2 |
|rowspan=2 |Eli Tannis16,02524.51%
|rowspan=2 |
|rowspan=2 |Morgan Gay10,45716.00%
|rowspan=2 |
|rowspan=2 |Les Schram3,6455.58%
|rowspan=2 |
|rowspan=2 |Rodrigo André Bolaños7171.10%
|rowspan=2 |
|rowspan=2 |Larry Wasslen990.15%
|
|Ahmed Bouragba (Ind.)141 0.22%
|rowspan=2 |
|rowspan=2 |David McGuinty
|-
|
|Sarmad Laith (Ind.)87 0.13%
|-
|rowspan=4 style="background-color:whitesmoke" |Ottawa—Vanier
|rowspan=4 |
|rowspan=4 |Mona Fortier32,67951.16%
|rowspan=4 |
|rowspan=4 |Joel E. Bernard11,11817.40%
|rowspan=4 |
|rowspan=4 |Stéphanie Mercier13,51621.16%
|rowspan=4 |
|rowspan=4 |Oriana Ngabirano4,7967.51%
|rowspan=4 |
|rowspan=4 |Paul Durst1,0641.67%
|rowspan=4 |
|rowspan=4 |Michelle Paquette1150.18%
|
|Joel Altman (Ind.)211 0.33%
|rowspan=4 |
|rowspan=4 |Mona Fortier
|-
|
|Christian Legeais (M-L)59 0.09%
|-
|
|Daniel James McHugh (Ind.)94 0.15%
|-
|
|Derek Miller (Rhino.)229 0.36%
|-
|rowspan=3 style="background-color:whitesmoke" |Ottawa West—Nepean
|rowspan=3 |
|rowspan=3 |Anita Vandenbeld28,37845.62%
|rowspan=3 |
|rowspan=3 |Abdul Abdi16,87627.13%
|rowspan=3 |
|rowspan=3 |Angella MacEwen11,64618.72%
|rowspan=3 |
|rowspan=3 |David Stibbe3,8946.26%
|rowspan=3 |
|rowspan=3 |Serguei Guevorkian8391.35%
|rowspan=3 |
|rowspan=3 |Vincent Cama1030.17%
|
|Nick Lin (M-L)48 0.08%
|rowspan=3 |
|rowspan=3 |Anita Vandenbeld
|-
|
|Butch Moore (NA)71 0.11%
|-
|
|Sean Mulligan (CHP)351 0.56%
|}<noinclude>

Eastern Ontario

|-
| style="background-color:whitesmoke" |Bay of Quinte
||
|Neil Ellis24,09939.16%
|
|Tim Durkin22,65036.80%
|
|Stephanie Bell9,85116.01%
|
|Danny Celovsky3,7406.08%
|
|Paul Bordonaro1,2071.96%
|
|
||
|Neil Ellis
|-
|rowspan=3 style="background-color:whitesmoke" |Glengarry—Prescott—Russell
|rowspan=3 |
|rowspan=3 |Francis Drouin31,29347.56%
|rowspan=3 |
|rowspan=3 |Pierre Lemieux23,66035.96%
|rowspan=3 |
|rowspan=3 |Konstantine Malakos6,85110.41%
|rowspan=3 |
|rowspan=3 |Marthe Lépine2,1133.21%
|rowspan=3 |
|rowspan=3 |Jean-Jacques Desgranges1,1741.78%
|
|Darcy Neal Donnelly (Libert.)262 0.40%
|rowspan=3 |
|rowspan=3 |Francis Drouin
|-
|
|Daniel John Fey (Ind.)239 0.36%
|-
|
|Marc-Antoine Gagnier (Rhino.)199 0.30%
|-
| style="background-color:whitesmoke" |Hastings—Lennox and Addington
|
|Mike Bossio19,72137.14%
||
|Derek Sloan21,96841.38%
|
|David Tough6,98413.15%
|
|Sari Watson3,1145.87%
|
|Adam L. E. Gray1,3072.46%
|
|
||
|Mike Bossio
|-
| style="background-color:whitesmoke" |Kingston and the Islands
||
|Mark Gerretsen31,20545.76%
|
|Ruslan Yakoviychuk13,30419.51%
|
|Barrington Walker15,85623.25%
|
|Candice Christmas6,0598.89%
|
|Andy Brooke1,7692.59%
|
|
||
|Mark Gerretsen
|-
| style="background-color:whitesmoke" |Lanark—Frontenac—Kingston
|
|Kayley Kennedy15,44124.71%
||
|Scott Reid30,07748.14%
|
|Satinka Schilling8,83514.14%
|
|Stephen Kotze7,01111.22%
|
|Matthew Barton1,1171.79%
|
|
||
|Scott Reid
|-
| style="background-color:whitesmoke" |Leeds—Grenville—Thousand Islands and Rideau Lakes
|
|Josh Bennett15,48226.49%
||
|Michael Barrett28,63048.98%
|
|Michelle Taylor8,20114.03%
|
|Lorraine Rekmans5,1528.81%
|
|Evan Hindle9881.69%
|
|
||
|Michael Barrett
|-
|rowspan=5 style="background-color:whitesmoke" |Renfrew—Nipissing—Pembroke
|rowspan=5 |
|rowspan=5 |Ruben Marini11,53219.56%
|rowspan=5 |
|rowspan=5 |Cheryl Gallant31,08052.72%
|rowspan=5 |
|rowspan=5 |Eileen Jones-Whyte8,78614.90%
|rowspan=5 |
|rowspan=5 |Ian Pineau3,2305.48%
|rowspan=5 |
|rowspan=5 |David Ainsworth1,4632.48%
|
|Robert Cherrin (VCP)358 0.61%
|rowspan=5 |
|rowspan=5 |Cheryl Gallant
|-
|
|Dan Criger (Ind.)1,125 1.91%
|-
|
|Jonathan Davis (Ind.)200 0.34%
|-
|
|Dheerendra Kumar (Ind.)917 1.56%
|-
|
|Stefan Klietsch (Libert.)266 0.45%
|-
| style="background-color:whitesmoke" |Stormont—Dundas—South Glengarry
|
|Heather Megill13,76725.63%
||
|Eric Duncan28,97653.95%
|
|Kelsey Catherine Schmitz7,67414.29%
|
|Raheem Aman2,1263.96%
|
|Sabile Trimm1,1682.17%
|
|
||
|Guy Lauzon†$
|}<noinclude>

Central Ontario

|-
| style="background-color:whitesmoke" | Barrie—Innisfil
|
|Lisa-Marie Wilson15,87929.27%
||
|John Brassard23,76543.80%
|
|Pekka Reinio8,88016.37%
|
|Bonnie North4,7168.69%
|
|Stephanie Robinson1,0131.87%
|
|
||
|John Brassard
|-
| style="background-color:whitesmoke" | Barrie—Springwater—Oro-Medonte
|
|Brian Kalliecharan16,80531.24%
||
|Doug Shipley20,98139.00%
|
|Dan Janssen7,97214.82%
|
|Marty Lancaster7,06613.14%
|
|David Patterson9691.80%
|
|
||
|Alex Nuttall†$
|-
| style="background-color:whitesmoke" |Bruce—Grey—Owen Sound
|
|Michael Den Tandt17,48529.98%
||
|Alex Ruff26,83046.22%
|
|Chris Stephen6,66611.59%
|
|Danielle Valiquette5,0078.70%
|
|Bill Townsend1,7022.96%
|
|Daniel Little (Libert.)3160.55%
||
|Larry Miller†$
|-
| style="background-color:whitesmoke" |Dufferin—Caledon
|
|Michele Fisher22,64533.00%
||
|Kyle Seeback28,85242.05%
|
|Allison Brown7,98111.63%
|
|Stefan Wiesen7,30310.64%
|
|Chad Ransom1,5162.21%
|
|Russ Emo (CHP)3190.46%
||
|David Tilson†
|-
| style="background-color:whitesmoke" |Haliburton—Kawartha Lakes—Brock
|
|Judi Forbes17,06725.95%
||
|Jamie Schmale32,25749.05%
|
|Barbara Doyle9,67614.71%
|
|Elizabeth Fraser5,5158.39%
|
|Gene Balfour1,2451.89%
|
|
||
|Jamie Schmale
|-
| style="background-color:whitesmoke" |Northumberland—Peterborough South
|
|Kim Rudd24,97736.22%
||
|Philip Lawrence27,38539.71%
|
|Mallory MacDonald9,61513.94%
|
|Jeff Wheeldon5,5248.01%
|
|Frank Vaughan1,4602.12%
|
|
||
|Kim Rudd
|-
|rowspan=2 style="background-color:whitesmoke" |Peterborough—Kawartha
|rowspan=2 |
|rowspan=2 |Maryam Monsef27,40039.25%
|rowspan=2 |
|rowspan=2 |Michael Skinner24,35734.89%
|rowspan=2 |
|rowspan=2 |Candace Shaw11,87217.01%
|rowspan=2 |
|rowspan=2 |Andrew MacGregor4,9307.06%
|rowspan=2 |
|rowspan=2 |Alexander Murphy8901.28%
|
|Robert M Bowers (Ind.)180 0.26%
|rowspan=2 |
|rowspan=2 |Maryam Monsef
|-
|
|Ken Ranney (SCC)172 0.25%
|-
| style="background-color:whitesmoke" |Simcoe—Grey
|
|Lorne Kenney23,92531.68%
||
|Terry Dowdall32,81243.45%
|
|Ilona Matthews8,46211.21%
|
|Sherri Jackson8,58911.37%
|
|Richard Sommer1,4161.88%
|
|Tony D'Angelo (VCP)3050.40%
||
|Kellie Leitch†
|-
| style="background-color:whitesmoke" |Simcoe North
|
|Gerry Hawes19,31030.76%
||
|Bruce Stanton27,24143.39%
|
|Angelique Belcourt8,85014.10%
|
|Valerie Powell5,8829.37%
|
|Stephen Makk1,1541.84%
|
|Chris Brown (CHP)3410.54%
||
|Bruce Stanton
|-
| style="background-color:whitesmoke" |York—Simcoe
|
|Cynthia Wesley-Esquimaux14,40726.79%
||
|Scot Davidson24,91846.33%
|
|Jessa McLean7,62014.17%
|
|Jonathan Arnold4,6508.65%
|
|Michael Lotter8751.63%
|
|Keith Komar (Libert.)1,3112.44%
||
|Scot Davidson
|}<noinclude>

Durham and York

|-
|rowspan=2 style="background-color:whitesmoke" |Ajax
|rowspan=2 |
|rowspan=2 |Mark Holland35,19857.68%
|rowspan=2 |
|rowspan=2 |Tom Dingwall15,86426.00%
|rowspan=2 |
|rowspan=2 |Shokat Malik7,03311.53%
|rowspan=2 |
|rowspan=2 |Maia Knight2,0403.34%
|rowspan=2 |
|rowspan=2 |Susanna Russo5880.96%
|
|Intab Ali (Ind.)111 0.18%
|rowspan=2 |
|rowspan=2 |Mark Holland
|-
|
|Allen Keith Hadley (Ind.)186 0.30%
|-
| style="background-color:whitesmoke" |Aurora—Oak Ridges—Richmond Hill
|
|Leah Taylor Roy22,50842.38%
||
|Leona Alleslev23,56844.38%
|
|Aaron Brown3,8207.19%
|
|Timothy Flemming2,1544.06%
|
|Priya Patil5301.00%
|
|Serge Korovitsyn (Libert.)5291.00%
||
|Leona Alleslev
|-
| style="background-color:whitesmoke" |Durham
|
|Jonathan Giancroce23,54732.25%
||
|Erin O'Toole30,75242.12%
|
|Sarah Whalen-Wright13,32318.25%
|
|Evan Price3,9505.41%
|
|Brenda Virtue1,4421.97%
|
|
||
|Erin O'Toole
|-
| style="background-color:whitesmoke" |King—Vaughan
||
|Deb Schulte28,72544.99%
|
|Anna Roberts27,58443.20%
|
|Emilio Bernardo-Ciddio4,2976.73%
|
|Ann Raney2,5113.93%
|
|Anton Strgacic7311.14%
|
|
||
|Deb Schulte
|-
| style="background-color:whitesmoke" |Markham—Stouffville
||
|Helena Jaczek25,05538.91%
|
|Theodore Antony19,70330.60%
|
|Hal Berman4,1326.42%
|
|Roy Long1,6212.52%
|
|Jeremy Lin5370.83%
|
|Jane Philpott (Ind.)13,34020.72%
||
|Jane Philpott#
|-
| style="background-color:whitesmoke" |Markham—Thornhill
||
|Mary Ng24,12453.91%
|
|Alex Yuan15,47434.58%
|
|Paul Sahbaz3,2647.29%
|
|Chris Williams1,2532.80%
|
|Peter Remedios3580.80%
|
|Josephbai Macwan (Ind.)2770.62%
||
|Mary Ng
|-
| style="background-color:whitesmoke" |Markham—Unionville
|
|Alan Ho20,48438.36%
||
|Bob Saroya26,13348.94%
|
|Gregory Hines3,5246.60%
|
|Elvin Kao2,3944.48%
|
|Sarah Chung8611.61%
|
|
||
|Bob Saroya
|-
|rowspan=2 style="background-color:whitesmoke" |Newmarket—Aurora
|rowspan=2 |
|rowspan=2 |Tony Van Bynen26,48843.10%
|rowspan=2 |
|rowspan=2 |Lois Brown23,25237.83%
|rowspan=2 |
|rowspan=2 |Yvonne Kelly6,57610.70%
|rowspan=2 |
|rowspan=2 |Walter Bauer3,5515.78%
|rowspan=2 |
|rowspan=2 |Andrew McCaughtrie5880.96%
|
|Dorian Baxter (PC)901 1.47%
|rowspan=2 |
|rowspan=2 |Kyle Peterson†
|-
|
|Laurie Goble (Rhino.)104 0.17%
|-
| style="background-color:whitesmoke" |Oshawa
|
|Afroza Hossain15,75025.41%
||
|Colin Carrie24,08738.86%
|
|Shailene Panylo17,66828.50%
|
|Jovannah Ramsden3,1515.08%
|
|Eric Mackenzie1,2151.96%
|
|Jeff Tomlinson (Comm.)1120.18%
||
|Colin Carrie
|-
| style="background-color:whitesmoke" |Pickering—Uxbridge
||
|Jennifer O'Connell32,38751.01%
|
|Cyma Musarat18,46229.08%
|
|Eileen Higdon7,58211.94%
|
|Peter Forint3,7995.98%
|
|Corneliu Chisu1,2651.99%
|
|
||
|Jennifer O'Connell
|-
| style="background-color:whitesmoke" |Richmond Hill
||
|Majid Jowhari21,80443.48%
|
|Costas Menegakis21,59243.06%
|
|Adam DeVita4,4258.82%
|
|Ichha Kohli1,6953.38%
|
|Igor Tvorogov5071.01%
|
|Otto Wevers (Rhino.)1260.25%
||
|Majid Jowhari
|-
|rowspan=2 style="background-color:whitesmoke" |Thornhill
|rowspan=2 |
|rowspan=2 |Gary Gladstone18,94635.42%
|rowspan=2 |
|rowspan=2 |Peter Kent29,18754.56%
|rowspan=2 |
|rowspan=2 |Sara Petruci3,4696.48%
|rowspan=2 |
|rowspan=2 |Josh Rachlis1,6002.99%
|rowspan=2 |
|rowspan=2 |
|
|Nathan Bregman (Rhino.)217 0.41%
|rowspan=2 |
|rowspan=2 |Peter Kent
|-
|
|Waseem Malik (CFF)77 0.14%
|-
| style="background-color:whitesmoke" |Vaughan—Woodbridge
||
|Francesco Sorbara25,81051.28%
|
|Teresa Kruze18,28936.34%
|
|Peter DeVita3,9107.77%
|
|Raquel Fronte1,3022.59%
|
|Domenic Montesano8521.69%
|
|Muhammad Hassan Khan (Ind.)1650.33%
||
|Francesco Sorbara
|-
| style="background-color:whitesmoke" |Whitby
||
|Ryan Turnbull30,18243.68%
|
|Todd McCarthy24,56435.55%
|
|Brian Dias9,76014.12%
|
|Paul Slavchenko3,7355.41%
|
|Mirko Pejic8601.24%
|
|
||
|Celina Caesar-Chavannes†
|}<noinclude>

Suburban Toronto

|-
| style="background-color:whitesmoke" |Don Valley East
||
|Yasmin Ratansi25,29559.81%
|
|Michael Ma10,11523.92%
|
|Nicholas Thompson4,64710.99%
|
|Dan Turcotte1,6753.96%
|
|John P. Hendry5621.33%
|
|
||
|Yasmin Ratansi
|-
| style="background-color:whitesmoke" |Don Valley North
||
|Han Dong23,49550.45%
|
|Sarah Fischer16,50635.44%
|
|Bruce Griffin4,2859.20%
|
|Daniel Giavedoni1,8033.87%
|
|Jay Sobel4821.03%
|
|
||
|Geng Tan†$
|-
| style="background-color:whitesmoke" |Etobicoke Centre
||
|Yvan Baker32,80051.88%
|
|Ted Opitz21,80434.49%
|
|Heather Vickers-Wong4,8817.72%
|
|Cameron Semple2,7754.39%
|
|Nicholas Serdiuk6641.05%
|
|Mark Wrzesniewski (Libert.)2950.47%
||
|Borys Wrzesnewskyj†
|-
| style="background-color:whitesmoke" |Etobicoke—Lakeshore
||
|James Maloney36,06151.88%
|
|Barry O'Brien19,95228.70%
|
|Branko Gasperlin8,27711.91%
|
|Chris Caldwell4,1415.96%
|
|Jude Sulejmani9211.32%
|
|Janice Murray (M-L)1630.23%
||
|James Maloney
|-
| style="background-color:whitesmoke" |Etobicoke North
||
|Kirsty Duncan26,38861.44%
|
|Sarabjit Kaur9,52422.18%
|
|Naiima Farah4,65410.84%
|
|Nancy Ghuman1,0802.51%
|
|Renata Ford1,1962.78%
|
|Sudhir Mehta (CFF)1040.24%
||
|Kirsty Duncan
|-
|rowspan=2 style="background-color:whitesmoke" |Humber River—Black Creek
|rowspan=2 |
|rowspan=2 |Judy Sgro23,18761.09%
|rowspan=2 |
|rowspan=2 |Iftikhar Choudry6,16416.24%
|rowspan=2 |
|rowspan=2 |Maria Augimeri7,19818.96%
|rowspan=2 |
|rowspan=2 |Mike Schmitz8042.12%
|rowspan=2 |
|rowspan=2 |Ania Krosinska4021.06%
|
|Christine Nugent (M-L)89 0.23%
|rowspan=2 |
|rowspan=2 |Judy Sgro
|-
|
|Stenneth Smith (UPC)114 0.30%
|-
| style="background-color:whitesmoke" |Scarborough—Agincourt
||
|Jean Yip21,11550.50%
|
|Sean Hu15,49237.05%
|
|Larisa Julius3,6368.70%
|
|Randi Ramdeen1,0502.51%
|
|Anthony Internicola5211.25%
|
|
||
|Jean Yip
|-
| style="background-color:whitesmoke" |Scarborough Centre
||
|Salma Zahid25,69555.19%
|
|Irshad Chaudhry10,38722.31%
|
|Faiz Kamal5,45211.71%
|
|Dordana Hakimzadah1,3362.87%
|
|Jeremiah Vijeyaratnam1,1622.50%
|
|John Cannis (Ind.)2,5245.42%
||
|Salma Zahid
|-
|rowspan=5 style="background-color:whitesmoke" |Scarborough—Guildwood
|rowspan=5 |
|rowspan=5 |John McKay26,12361.12%
|rowspan=5 |
|rowspan=5 |Quintus Thuraisingham9,55322.35%
|rowspan=5 |
|rowspan=5 |Michelle Spencer4,80611.24%
|rowspan=5 |
|rowspan=5 |Tara McMahon1,2202.85%
|rowspan=5 |
|rowspan=5 |Jigna Jani6481.52%
|
|Stephen Abara (Ind.)70 0.16%
|rowspan=5 |
|rowspan=5 |John McKay
|-
|
|Farhan Alvi (CFF)55 0.13%
|-
|
|Kevin Clarke (Ind.)112 0.26%
|-
|
|Kathleen Marie Holding (Ind.)70 0.16%
|-
|
|Gus Stefanis (CNP)85 0.20%
|-
| style="background-color:whitesmoke" |Scarborough North
||
|Shaun Chen20,91153.57%
|
|David Kong11,83830.33%
|
|Yan Chen5,03912.91%
|
|Avery Velez7962.04%
|
|Jude Guerrier3700.95%
|
|Janet Robinson (UPC)830.21%
||
|Shaun Chen
|-
| style="background-color:whitesmoke" |Scarborough—Rouge Park
||
|Gary Anandasangaree31,36062.19%
|
|Bobby Singh10,11520.06%
|
|Kingsley Kwok5,80111.50%
|
|Jessica Hamilton2,3304.62%
|
|Dilano Sally4670.93%
|
|Mark Theodoru (CHP)3530.70%
||
|Gary Anandasangaree
|-
| style="background-color:whitesmoke" |Scarborough Southwest
||
|Bill Blair28,96557.20%
|
|Kimberly Fawcett Smith10,50220.74%
|
|Keith McCrady7,86515.53%
|
|Amanda Cain2,4774.89%
|
|Italo Erastostene5901.17%
|
|Simon Luisi (Animal)2360.47%
||
|Bill Blair
|-
|rowspan=2 style="background-color:whitesmoke" |Willowdale
|rowspan=2 |
|rowspan=2 |Ali Ehsassi22,28249.00%
|rowspan=2 |
|rowspan=2 |Daniel Lee16,45236.18%
|rowspan=2 |
|rowspan=2 |Leah Kalsi4,2319.31%
|rowspan=2 |
|rowspan=2 |Sharolyn Vettese1,6713.67%
|rowspan=2 |
|rowspan=2 |Richard Hillier5631.24%
|
|Birinder Singh Ahluwalia (Ind.)200 0.44%
|rowspan=2 |
|rowspan=2 |Ali Ehsassi
|-
|
|Shodja Ziaian (Ind.)71 0.16%
|-
| style="background-color:whitesmoke" |York Centre
||
|Michael Levitt21,68050.20%
|
|Rachel Willson15,85236.71%
|
|Andrea Vásquez Jiménez4,2519.84%
|
|Rebecca Wood1,4033.25%
|
|
|
|
||
|Michael Levitt
|}<noinclude>

Central Toronto

|-
| style="background-color:whitesmoke" |Beaches—East York
||
|Nathaniel Erskine-Smith32,64757.20%
|
|Nadirah Nazeer8,02614.06%
|
|Mae J. Nam12,19621.37%
|
|Sean Manners3,3785.92%
|
|Deborah McKenzie8311.46%
|
|
||
|Nathaniel Erskine-Smith
|-
|rowspan=3 style="background-color:whitesmoke" |Davenport
|rowspan=3 |
|rowspan=3 |Julie Dzerowicz23,25143.72%
|rowspan=3 |
|rowspan=3 |Sanjay Bhatia4,9219.25%
|rowspan=3 |
|rowspan=3 |Andrew Cash21,81241.02%
|rowspan=3 |
|rowspan=3 |Hannah Conover-Arthurs2,3974.51%
|rowspan=3 |
|rowspan=3 |Francesco Ciardullo4960.93%
|
|Chai Kalevar (Ind.)79 0.15%
|rowspan=3 |
|rowspan=3 |Julie Dzerowicz
|-
|
|Elizabeth Rowley (Comm.)138 0.26%
|-
|
|Troy Young (Ind.)86 0.16%
|-
| style="background-color:whitesmoke" |Don Valley West
||
|Rob Oliphant29,14855.80%
|
|Yvonne Robertson16,30431.21%
|
|Laurel MacDowell3,8047.28%
|
|Amanda Kistindey2,2574.32%
|
|Ian Prittie4440.85%
|
|John Kittredge (Libert.)2770.53%
||
|Rob Oliphant
|-
| style="background-color:whitesmoke" |Eglinton—Lawrence
||
|Marco Mendicino29,85053.30%
|
|Chani Aryeh-Bain18,54933.12%
|
|Alexandra Nash4,7418.47%
|
|Reuben DeBoer2,2784.07%
|
|Michael Staffieri5861.05%
|
|
||
|Marco Mendicino
|-
|rowspan=3 style="background-color:whitesmoke" |Parkdale—High Park
|rowspan=3 |
|rowspan=3 |Arif Virani28,85247.39%
|rowspan=3 |
|rowspan=3 |Adam Pham8,01513.16%
|rowspan=3 |
|rowspan=3 |Paul Taylor19,18031.50%
|rowspan=3 |
|rowspan=3 |Nick Capra3,9166.43%
|rowspan=3 |
|rowspan=3 |Greg Wycliffe6431.06%
|
|Lorne Gershuny (M-L)43 0.07%
|rowspan=3 |
|rowspan=3 |Arif Virani
|-
|
|Alykhan Pabani (Comm.)119 0.20%
|-
|
|Terry Parker (Mar.)119 0.20%
|-
| style="background-color:whitesmoke" |Spadina—Fort York
||
|Adam Vaughan33,82255.77%
|
|Frank Fang10,68017.61%
|
|Diana Yoon12,18820.10%
|
|Dean Maher3,1745.23%
|
|Robert Stewart6721.11%
|
|Marcela Ramirez (Ind.)1140.19%
||
|Adam Vaughan
|-
|rowspan=5 style="background-color:whitesmoke" |Toronto Centre
|rowspan=5 |
|rowspan=5 |Bill Morneau31,27157.37%
|rowspan=5 |
|rowspan=5 |Ryan Lester6,61312.13%
|rowspan=5 |
|rowspan=5 |Brian Chang12,14222.27%
|rowspan=5 |
|rowspan=5 |Annamie Paul3,8527.07%
|rowspan=5 |
|rowspan=5 |
|
|Sean Carson (Rhino.)147 0.27%
|rowspan=5 |
|rowspan=5 |Bill Morneau
|-
|
|Bronwyn Cragg (Comm.)125 0.23%
|-
|
|Philip Fernandez (M-L)54 0.10%
|-
|
|Rob Lewin (Animal)182 0.33%
|-
|
|Jason Tavares (Ind.)126 0.23%
|-
|rowspan=3 style="background-color:whitesmoke" |Toronto—Danforth
|rowspan=3 |
|rowspan=3 |Julie Dabrusin27,68147.68%
|rowspan=3 |
|rowspan=3 |Zia Choudhary6,09110.49%
|rowspan=3 |
|rowspan=3 |Min Sook Lee19,28333.21%
|rowspan=3 |
|rowspan=3 |Chris Tolley3,7616.48%
|rowspan=3 |
|rowspan=3 |Tara Dos Remedios6211.07%
|
|Elizabeth Abbott (Animal)261 0.45%
|rowspan=3 |
|rowspan=3 |Julie Dabrusin
|-
|
|Ivan Byard (Comm.)151 0.26%
|-
|
|John Kladitis (Ind.)210 0.36%
|-
| style="background-color:whitesmoke" |Toronto—St. Paul's
||
|Carolyn Bennett32,49454.31%
|
|Jae Truesdell12,93321.61%
|
|Alok Mukherjee9,44215.78%
|
|Sarah Climenhaga4,0426.76%
|
|John Kellen9231.54%
|
|
||
|Carolyn Bennett
|-
|rowspan=4 style="background-color:whitesmoke" |University—Rosedale
|rowspan=4 |
|rowspan=4 |Chrystia Freeland29,65251.67%
|rowspan=4 |
|rowspan=4 |Helen-Claire Tingling9,34216.28%
|rowspan=4 |
|rowspan=4 |Melissa Jean-Baptiste Vajda12,57321.91%
|rowspan=4 |
|rowspan=4 |Tim Grant4,8618.47%
|rowspan=4 |
|rowspan=4 |Aran Lockwood5100.89%
|
|Karin Brothers (SCC)124 0.22%
|rowspan=4 |
|rowspan=4 |Chrystia Freeland
|-
|
|Drew Garvie (Comm.)143 0.25%
|-
|
|Steve Rutschinski (M-L)27 0.05%
|-
|
|Liz White (Animal)159 0.28%
|-
| style="background-color:whitesmoke" |York South—Weston
||
|Ahmed Hussen25,97658.42%
|
|Jasveen Rattan8,41518.93%
|
|Yafet Tewelde7,75417.44%
|
|Nicki Ward1,6333.67%
|
|Gerard Racine6851.54%
|
|
||
|Ahmed Hussen
|}<noinclude>

Brampton, Mississauga and Oakville

|-
| style="background-color:whitesmoke" |Brampton Centre
||
|Ramesh Sangha18,77147.21%
|
|Pawanjit Gosal10,69626.90%
|
|Jordan Boswell7,81919.67%
|
|Pauline Thornham1,6854.24%
|
|Baljit Bawa6811.71%
|
|David Gershuny (M-L)1060.27%
||
|Ramesh Sangha
|-
|rowspan=2 style="background-color:whitesmoke" |Brampton East
|rowspan=2 |
|rowspan=2 |Maninder Sidhu24,05047.39%
|rowspan=2 |
|rowspan=2 |Ramona Singh12,12523.89%
|rowspan=2 |
|rowspan=2 |Saranjit Singh13,36826.34%
|rowspan=2 |
|rowspan=2 |Teresa Burgess-Ogilvie6661.31%
|rowspan=2 |
|rowspan=2 |Gaurav Walia2440.48%
|
|Partap Dua (CFF)89 0.18%
|rowspan=2 |
|rowspan=2 |Raj Grewal†#
|-
|
|Manpreet Othi (Ind.)211 0.42%
|-
| style="background-color:whitesmoke" |Brampton North
||
|Ruby Sahota25,97051.42%
|
|Arpan Khanna13,97327.67%
|
|Melissa Edwards8,53316.90%
|
|Norbert D'Costa1,5163.00%
|
|Keith Frazer5101.01%
|
|
||
|Ruby Sahota
|-
|rowspan=3 style="background-color:whitesmoke" |Brampton South
|rowspan=3 |
|rowspan=3 |Sonia Sidhu24,08549.47%
|rowspan=3 |
|rowspan=3 |Ramandeep Brar13,82828.40%
|rowspan=3 |
|rowspan=3 |Mandeep Kaur7,98516.40%
|rowspan=3 |
|rowspan=3 |Karen Fraser1,9263.96%
|rowspan=3 |
|rowspan=3 |Rajwinder Ghuman3540.73%
|
|Mitesh Joshi (CFF)152 0.31%
|rowspan=3 |
|rowspan=3 |Sonia Sidhu
|-
|
|Wavey Mercer (CHP)285 0.59%
|-
|
|Dagmar Sullivan (M-L)68 0.14%
|-
|rowspan=3 style="background-color:whitesmoke" |Brampton West
|rowspan=3 |
|rowspan=3 |Kamal Khera28,74353.54%
|rowspan=3 |
|rowspan=3 |Murarilal Thapliyal12,82423.89%
|rowspan=3 |
|rowspan=3 |Navjit Kaur9,85518.36%
|rowspan=3 |
|rowspan=3 |Jane Davidson1,2712.37%
|rowspan=3 |
|rowspan=3 |Roger Sampson5050.94%
|
|Harinderpal Hundal (Comm.)97 0.18%
|rowspan=3 |
|rowspan=3 |Kamal Khera
|-
|
|Anjum Malik (CFF)69 0.13%
|-
|
|Paul Tannahill (CHP)319 0.59%
|-
| style="background-color:whitesmoke" |Mississauga Centre
||
|Omar Alghabra29,97455.76%
|
|Milad Mikael15,87429.53%
|
|Sarah Walji5,1739.62%
|
|Hugo Reinoso1,6463.06%
|
|David Micalef8371.56%
|
|Greg Vezina (Ind.)2520.47%
||
|Omar Alghabra
|-
| style="background-color:whitesmoke" |Mississauga East—Cooksville
||
|Peter Fonseca27,92353.06%
|
|Wladyslaw Lizon17,66433.57%
|
|Tom Takacs4,6438.82%
|
|Maha Rasheed1,5783.00%
|
|Syed Rizvi6371.21%
|
|Anna Di Carlo (M-L)1780.34%
||
|Peter Fonseca
|-
| style="background-color:whitesmoke" |Mississauga—Erin Mills
||
|Iqra Khalid31,18153.52%
|
|Hani Tawfilis19,05032.70%
|
|Salman Tariq5,2368.99%
|
|Remo Boscarino-Gaetano2,1473.69%
|
|Hazar Alsabagh6481.11%
|
|
||
|Iqra Khalid
|-
| style="background-color:whitesmoke" |Mississauga—Lakeshore
||
|Sven Spengemann29,52648.40%
|
|Stella Ambler22,74037.28%
|
|Adam Laughton5,1038.37%
|
|Cynthia Trentelman2,8144.61%
|
|Eugen Vizitiu7171.18%
|
|Carlton Darby (UPC)990.16%
||
|Sven Spengemann
|-
|rowspan=2 style="background-color:whitesmoke" |Mississauga—Malton
|rowspan=2 |
|rowspan=2 |Navdeep Bains27,89057.46%
|rowspan=2 |
|rowspan=2 |Tom Varughese12,52825.81%
|rowspan=2 |
|rowspan=2 |Nikki Clarke6,10312.57%
|rowspan=2 |
|rowspan=2 |Christina Porter1,2512.58%
|rowspan=2 |
|rowspan=2 |Tahir Gora3690.76%
|
|Prudence Buchanan (UPC)306 0.63%
|rowspan=2 |
|rowspan=2 |Navdeep Bains
|-
|
|Frank Chilelli (M-L)90 0.19%
|-
| style="background-color:whitesmoke" |Mississauga—Streetsville
||
|Gagan Sikand29,61850.40%
|
|Ghada Melek19,47433.14%
|
|Samir Girguis6,03610.27%
|
|Chris Hill2,6884.57%
|
|Thomas McIver7061.20%
|
|Natalie Spizzirri (Animal)2430.41%
||
|Gagan Sikand
|-
| style="background-color:whitesmoke" |Oakville
||
|Anita Anand30,26546.28%
|
|Terence Young25,56139.08%
|
|Jerome Adamo4,9287.54%
|
|James Elwick3,7045.66%
|
|JD Meaney7981.22%
|
|Sushila Pereira (CHP)1450.22%
||
|John Oliver†$
|-
| style="background-color:whitesmoke" |Oakville North—Burlington
||
|Pam Damoff33,59748.26%
|
|Sean Weir26,48438.04%
|
|Nicolas Dion5,8668.43%
|
|Michael Houghton2,9254.20%
|
|Gilbert Joseph Jubinville7511.08%
|
|
||
|Pam Damoff
|}<noinclude>

Hamilton, Burlington and Niagara

|-
| style="background-color:whitesmoke" |Burlington
||
|Karina Gould34,98948.61%
|
|Jane Michael23,93033.24%
|
|Lenaee Dupuis7,37210.24%
|
|Gareth Williams4,7506.60%
|
|Peter Smetana9441.31%
|
|
||
|Karina Gould
|-
| style="background-color:whitesmoke" |Flamborough—Glanbrook
|
|Jennifer Stebbing22,87536.58%
||
|David Sweet24,52739.22%
|
|Allison Cillis10,32216.50%
|
|Janet Errygers3,8336.13%
|
|David Tilden9821.57%
|
|
||
|David Sweet
|-
|rowspan=4 style="background-color:whitesmoke" |Hamilton Centre
|rowspan=4 |
|rowspan=4 |Jasper Kujavsky12,65128.67%
|rowspan=4 |
|rowspan=4 |Monica Ciriello6,34114.37%
|rowspan=4 |
|rowspan=4 |Matthew Green20,36846.16%
|rowspan=4 |
|rowspan=4 |Jason Lopez3,3707.64%
|rowspan=4 |
|rowspan=4 |Melina Mamone8331.89%
|
|Gary Duyzer (CHP)182 0.41%
|rowspan=4 |
|rowspan=4 |David Christopherson†
|-
|
|Edward Graydon (Ind.)134 0.30%
|-
|
|Tony Lemma (Ind.)158 0.36%
|-
|
|Nathalie Xian Yi Yan (Ind.)85 0.19%
|-
| style="background-color:whitesmoke" |Hamilton East—Stoney Creek
||
|Bob Bratina20,11238.57%
|
|Nikki Kaur13,13025.18%
|
|Nick Milanovic14,93028.63%
|
|Peter Ormond2,9025.57%
|
|Charles Crocker1,0722.06%
|
|
||
|Bob Bratina
|-
|rowspan=2 style="background-color:whitesmoke" |Hamilton Mountain
|rowspan=2 |
|rowspan=2 |Bruno Uggenti16,05730.33%
|rowspan=2 |
|rowspan=2 |Peter Dyakowski13,44325.39%
|rowspan=2 |
|rowspan=2 |Scott Duvall19,13536.14%
|rowspan=2 |
|rowspan=2 |Dave Urquhart3,1155.88%
|rowspan=2 |
|rowspan=2 |Trevor Lee7601.44%
|
|Jim Enos (CHP)330 0.62%
|rowspan=2 |
|rowspan=2 |Scott Duvall
|-
|
|Richard Plett (Rhino.)109 0.21%
|-
| style="background-color:whitesmoke" |Hamilton West—Ancaster—Dundas
||
|Filomena Tassi30,21446.55%
|
|Bert Laranjo17,34026.72%
|
|Yousaf Malik11,52717.76%
|
|Victoria Galea4,7707.35%
|
|Daniel Ricottone8941.38%
|
|Spencer Rocchi (Rhino.)1560.24%
||
|Filomena Tassi
|-
| style="background-color:whitesmoke" |Milton
||
|Adam van Koeverden30,88251.75%
|
|Lisa Raitt21,56436.13%
|
|Farina Hassan3,8516.45%
|
|Eleanor Hayward2,7694.64%
|
|Percy Dastur6131.03%
|
|
||
|Lisa Raitt
|-
|rowspan=2 style="background-color:whitesmoke" |Niagara Centre
|rowspan=2 |
|rowspan=2 |Vance Badawey20,29235.01%
|rowspan=2 |
|rowspan=2 |April Jeffs17,98731.03%
|rowspan=2 |
|rowspan=2 |Malcolm Allen15,46926.69%
|rowspan=2 |
|rowspan=2 |Michael Tomaino3,0545.27%
|rowspan=2 |
|rowspan=2 |Andrew Sainz-Nieto7761.34%
|
|Nic Bylsma (CHP)308 0.53%
|rowspan=2 |
|rowspan=2 |Vance Badawey
|-
|
|Robert Walker (M-L)77 0.13%
|-
|rowspan=2 style="background-color:whitesmoke" |Niagara Falls
|rowspan=2 |
|rowspan=2 |Andrea Kaiser22,69032.54%
|rowspan=2 |
|rowspan=2 |Tony Baldinelli24,75135.49%
|rowspan=2 |
|rowspan=2 |Brian Barker12,56618.02%
|rowspan=2 |
|rowspan=2 |Sandra O'Connor3,4044.88%
|rowspan=2 |
|rowspan=2 |Alexander Taylor9681.39%
|
|Tricia O'Connor (CHP)358 0.51%
|rowspan=2 |
|rowspan=2 |Rob Nicholson†$
|-
|
|Mike Strange (Ind.)4,997 7.17%
|-
| style="background-color:whitesmoke" |Niagara West
|
|Ian Bingham17,42932.32%
||
|Dean Allison24,44745.34%
|
|Nameer Rahman6,54012.13%
|
|Terry Teather3,6206.71%
|
|Miles Morton8691.61%
|
|Harold Jonker (CHP)1,0191.89%
||
|Dean Allison
|-
| style="background-color:whitesmoke" |St. Catharines
||
|Chris Bittle24,18340.23%
|
|Krystina Waler18,97831.57%
|
|Dennis Van Meer12,43120.68%
|
|Travis Mason3,6956.15%
|
|Allan DeRoo8261.37%
|
|
||
|Chris Bittle
|}<noinclude>

Midwestern Ontario

|-
|rowspan=3 style="background-color:whitesmoke" |Brantford—Brant
|rowspan=3 |
|rowspan=3 |Danielle Takacs20,45430.68%
|rowspan=3 |
|rowspan=3 |Phil McColeman26,84940.27%
|rowspan=3 |
|rowspan=3 |Sabrina Sawyer13,13119.70%
|rowspan=3 |
|rowspan=3 |Bob Jonkman4,2576.39%
|rowspan=3 |
|rowspan=3 |Dave Wrobel1,3201.98%
|
|Leslie Bory (Ind.)115 0.17%
|rowspan=3 |
|rowspan=3 |Phil McColeman
|-
|
|Jeffrey Gallagher (VCP)394 0.59%
|-
|
|John The Engineer Turmel (Ind.)146 0.22%
|-
|rowspan=2 style="background-color:whitesmoke" |Cambridge
|rowspan=2 |
|rowspan=2 |Bryan May22,90339.53%
|rowspan=2 |
|rowspan=2 |Sunny Attwal17,40930.05%
|rowspan=2 |
|rowspan=2 |Scott Hamilton11,17719.29%
|rowspan=2 |
|rowspan=2 |Michele Braniff4,3437.50%
|rowspan=2 |
|rowspan=2 |David Haskell1,8723.23%
|
|Manuel Couto (M-L)76 0.13%
|rowspan=2 |
|rowspan=2 |Bryan May
|-
|
|George McMorrow (VCP)162 0.28%
|-
|rowspan=4 style="background-color:whitesmoke" |Guelph
|rowspan=4 |
|rowspan=4 |Lloyd Longfield30,49740.36%
|rowspan=4 |
|rowspan=4 |Ashish Sachan14,56819.28%
|rowspan=4 |
|rowspan=4 |Aisha Jahangir9,29712.30%
|rowspan=4 |
|rowspan=4 |Steve Dyck19,23625.46%
|rowspan=4 |
|rowspan=4 |Mark Paralovos1,0871.44%
|
|Juanita Burnett (Comm.)166 0.22%
|rowspan=4 |
|rowspan=4 |Lloyd Longfield
|-
|
|Kornelis Klevering (Ind.)86 0.11%
|-
|
|Gordon Truscott (CHP)498 0.66%
|-
|
|Michael Wassilyn (Ind.)133 0.18%
|-
|rowspan=2 style="background-color:whitesmoke" |Haldimand—Norfolk
|rowspan=2 |
|rowspan=2 |Kim Huffman14,70424.54%
|rowspan=2 |
|rowspan=2 |Diane Finley28,01846.75%
|rowspan=2 |
|rowspan=2 |Adrienne Roberts9,19215.34%
|rowspan=2 |
|rowspan=2 |Brooke Martin4,8788.14%
|rowspan=2 |
|rowspan=2 |Bob Forbes1,2342.06%
|
|Lily Eggink (CHP)817 1.36%
|rowspan=2 |
|rowspan=2 |Diane Finley
|-
|
|Harold Stewart (VCP)1,083 1.81%
|-
| style="background-color:whitesmoke" |Huron—Bruce
|
|Allan Thompson20,16733.13%
||
|Ben Lobb29,51248.49%
|
|Tony McQuail7,42112.19%
|
|Nicholas Wendler2,6654.38%
|
|Kevin M. Klerks1,1021.81%
|
|
||
|Ben Lobb
|-
| style="background-color:whitesmoke" |Kitchener Centre
||
|Raj Saini20,31636.69%
|
|Stephen Woodworth13,19123.82%
|
|Andrew Moraga6,23811.27%
|
|Mike Morrice14,39425.99%
|
|Patrick Bernier1,0331.87%
|
|Ellen Papenburg (Animal)2020.36%
||
|Raj Saini
|-
| style="background-color:whitesmoke" |Kitchener—Conestoga
||
|Tim Louis20,48039.74%
|
|Harold Albrecht20,11539.03%
|
|Riani De Wet5,20410.10%
|
|Stephanie Goertz4,9469.60%
|
|Koltyn Wallar7901.53%
|
|
||
|Harold Albrecht
|-
|rowspan=2 style="background-color:whitesmoke" |Kitchener South—Hespeler
|rowspan=2 |
|rowspan=2 |Marwan Tabbara20,98640.18%
|rowspan=2 |
|rowspan=2 |Alan Keeso17,48033.47%
|rowspan=2 |
|rowspan=2 |Wasai Rahimi6,94513.30%
|rowspan=2 |
|rowspan=2 |David Weber5,67110.86%
|rowspan=2 |
|rowspan=2 |Joseph Todd1,0051.92%
|
|Elaine Baetz (M-L)56 0.11%
|rowspan=2 |
|rowspan=2 |Marwan Tabbara
|-
|
|Matthew Correia (VCP)90 0.17%
|-
| style="background-color:whitesmoke" |Oxford
|
|Brendan Knight11,74519.29%
||
|Dave MacKenzie29,31048.14%
|
|Matthew Chambers12,30620.21%
|
|Lisa Birtch-Carriere4,7707.83%
|
|Wendy Martin1,7742.91%
|
||Melody Aldred (CHP)9861.62%
||
|Dave MacKenzie
|-
| style="background-color:whitesmoke" |Perth—Wellington
|
|Pirie Mitchell15,00227.13%
||
|John Nater25,62246.34%
|
|Geoff Krauter8,09414.64%
|
|Collan Simmons4,9498.95%
|
|Roger Fuhr8941.62%
|
|Irma Devries (CHP)7331.33%
||
|John Nater
|-
| style="background-color:whitesmoke" |Waterloo
||
|Bardish Chagger31,08548.79%
|
|Jerry Zhang15,61524.51%
|
|Lori Campbell9,71015.24%
|
|Kirsten Wright6,1849.71%
|
|Erika Traub1,1121.75%
|
|
||
|Bardish Chagger
|-
| style="background-color:whitesmoke" |Wellington—Halton Hills
|
|Lesley Barron19,77728.38%
||
|Michael Chong33,04447.42%
|
|Andrew Bascombe6,4999.33%
|
|Ralph Martin8,85112.70%
|
|Syl Carle1,5092.17%
|
|
||
|Michael Chong
|}<noinclude>

Southwestern Ontario

|-
| style="background-color:whitesmoke" |Chatham-Kent—Leamington
|
|Katie Omstead16,89931.24%
||
|Dave Epp25,35946.88%
|
|Tony Walsh8,22915.21%
|
|Mark Vercouteren2,2334.13%
|
|John Balagtas1,0611.96%
|
|Paul Coulbeck (Mar.)3070.57%
||
|Dave Van Kesteren†
|-
|rowspan=2 style="background-color:whitesmoke" |Elgin—Middlesex—London
|rowspan=2 |
|rowspan=2 |Pam Armstrong14,32423.20%
|rowspan=2 |
|rowspan=2 |Karen Vecchio31,02650.24%
|rowspan=2 |
|rowspan=2 |Bob Hargreaves11,01917.84%
|rowspan=2 |
|rowspan=2 |Ericha Hendel3,5625.77%
|rowspan=2 |
|rowspan=2 |Donald Helkaa9561.55%
|
|Peter Redecop (CHP)618 1.00%
|rowspan=2 |
|rowspan=2 |Karen Vecchio
|-
|
|Richard Styve (Libert.)249 0.40%
|-
| style="background-color:whitesmoke" |Essex
|
|Audrey Festeryga12,98719.02%
||
|Chris Lewis28,27441.40%
|
|Tracey Ramsey23,60334.56%
|
|Jennifer Alderson2,1733.18%
|
|Bill Capes1,2511.83%
|
|
||
|Tracey Ramsey
|-
| style="background-color:whitesmoke" |Lambton—Kent—Middlesex
|
|Jesse McCormick14,81425.36%
||
|Lianne Rood28,65149.05%
|
|Dylan Mclay9,35516.02%
|
|Anthony Li3,4635.93%
|
|Bria Atkins1,8043.09%
|
|Rob Lalande (VCP)3250.56%
||
|Bev Shipley†
|-
| style="background-color:whitesmoke" |London—Fanshawe
|
|Mohamed Hammoud14,92426.85%
|
|Michael van Holst13,77024.78%
||
|Lindsay Mathyssen22,67140.79%
|
|Tom Cull2,7815.00%
|
|Bela Kosoian1,1322.04%
|
|Stephen Campbell (Ind.)2970.53%
||
|Irene Mathyssen†
|-
| style="background-color:whitesmoke" |London North Centre
||
|Peter Fragiskatos27,24742.75%
|
|Sarah Bokhari15,06623.64%
|
|Dirka Prout14,88723.36%
|
|Carol Dyck4,8727.64%
|
|Salim Mansur1,5322.40%
|
|Clara Sorrenti (Comm.)1370.21%
||
|Peter Fragiskatos
|-
| style="background-color:whitesmoke" |London West
||
|Kate Young30,62242.96%
|
|Liz Snelgrove19,91027.93%
|
|Shawna Lewkowitz15,22021.35%
|
|Mary Ann Hodge3,8275.37%
|
|Mike Mcmullen1,1711.64%
|
|Jacques Boudreau (Libert.)5230.73%
||
|Kate Young
|-
| style="background-color:whitesmoke" |Sarnia—Lambton
|
|Carmen Lemieux12,04120.79%
||
|Marilyn Gladu28,62349.42%
|
|Adam Kilner12,64421.83%
|
|Peter Robert Smith2,4904.30%
|
|Brian Everaert1,5872.74%
|
|Thomas Laird (CHP)5310.92%
||
|Marilyn Gladu
|-
| style="background-color:whitesmoke" |Windsor—Tecumseh
||
|Irek Kusmierczyk19,04633.44%
|
|Leo Demarce15,85127.83%
|
|Cheryl Hardcastle18,41732.33%
|
|Giovanni Abati2,1773.82%
|
|Dan Burr1,2792.25%
|
|Laura Chesnik (M-L)1870.33%
||
|Cheryl Hardcastle
|-
| style="background-color:whitesmoke" |Windsor West
|
|Sandra Pupatello18,87836.33%
|
|Henry Lau9,92519.10%
||
|Brian Masse20,80040.03%
|
|Quinn Hunt1,3252.55%
|
|Darryl Burrell9581.84%
|
|Margaret Villamizar (M-L)760.15%
||
|Brian Masse
|}<noinclude>

Northern Ontario

|-
| style="background-color:whitesmoke" |Algoma—Manitoulin—Kapuskasing
|
|Heather Wilson9,87924.34%
|
|David Williamson10,62526.18%
||
|Carol Hughes16,88341.59%
|
|Max Chapman2,1925.40%
|
|Dave Delisle8872.19%
|
|Le Marquis De Marmalade (Rhino.)1250.31%
||
|Carol Hughes
|-
| style="background-color:whitesmoke" |Kenora
|
|Bob Nault8,33530.00%
||
|Eric Melillo9,44533.99%
|
|Rudy Turtle7,92328.51%
|
|Kirsi Ralko1,5265.49%
|
|Michael Di Pasquale3881.40%
|
|Kelvin Boucher-Chicago (Ind.)1700.61%
||
|Bob Nault
|-
| style="background-color:whitesmoke" |Nickel Belt
||
|Marc G Serré19,04638.99%
|
|Aino Laamanen10,34321.17%
|
|Stef Paquette15,65632.05%
|
|Casey Lalonde2,6445.41%
|
|Mikko Paavola1,1592.37%
|
|
||
|Marc Serré
|-
| style="background-color:whitesmoke" |Nipissing—Timiskaming
||
|Anthony Rota19,35240.55%
|
|Jordy Carr12,98427.20%
|
|Rob Boulet9,78420.50%
|
|Alex Gomm3,1116.52%
|
|Mark King2,4965.23%
|
|
||
|Anthony Rota
|-
| style="background-color:whitesmoke" |Parry Sound—Muskoka
|
|Trisha Cowie16,61530.40%
||
|Scott Aitchison22,84541.79%
|
|Tom Young6,41711.74%
|
|Gord Miller8,40915.38%
|
|
|
|Daniel Predie Jr (Ind.)3770.69%
||
|Tony Clement†#
|-
| style="background-color:whitesmoke" |Sault Ste. Marie
||
|Terry Sheehan16,28439.05%
|
|Sonny Spina13,40732.15%
|
|Sara McCleary9,45922.68%
|
|Geo McLean1,8094.34%
|
|Amy Zuccato7411.78%
|
|
||
|Terry Sheehan
|-
|rowspan=3 style="background-color:whitesmoke" |Sudbury
|rowspan=3 |
|rowspan=3 |Paul Lefebvre19,64340.94%
|rowspan=3 |
|rowspan=3 |Pierre St-Amant9,86420.56%
|rowspan=3 |
|rowspan=3 |Beth Mairs13,88528.94%
|rowspan=3 |
|rowspan=3 |Bill Crumplin3,2256.72%
|rowspan=3 |
|rowspan=3 |Sean Paterson8731.82%
|
|Chanel Lalonde (Animal)282 0.59%
|rowspan=3 |
|rowspan=3 |Paul Lefebvre
|-
|
|J. David Popescu (Ind.)70 0.15%
|-
|
|Charlene Sylvestre (Ind.)135 0.28%
|-
| style="background-color:whitesmoke" |Thunder Bay—Rainy River
||
|Marcus Powlowski14,49835.32%
|
|Linda Rydholm12,03929.33%
|
|Yuk-Sem Won11,94429.10%
|
|Amanda Moddejonge1,8294.46%
|
|Andrew Hartnell7411.81%
|
|
||
|Don Rusnak†$
|-
| style="background-color:whitesmoke" |Thunder Bay—Superior North
||
|Patty Hajdu18,50242.85%
|
|Frank Pullia11,03625.56%
|
|Anna Betty Achneepineskum9,12621.14%
|
|Bruce Hyer3,6398.43%
|
|Youssef Khanjari7341.70%
|
|Alexander Vodden (Libert.)1400.32%
||
|Patty Hajdu
|-
| style="background-color:whitesmoke" |Timmins—James Bay
|
|Michelle Boileau9,44325.70%
|
|Kraymr Grenke9,90726.97%
||
|Charlie Angus14,88540.51%
|
|Max Kennedy1,2573.42%
|
|Renaud Roy1,2483.40%
|
|
||
|Charlie Angus
|}<noinclude>

Manitoba

Rural Manitoba

|-
|rowspan=2 style="background-color:whitesmoke" |Brandon—Souris
|rowspan=2 |
|rowspan=2 |Terry Hayward4,97212.07%
|rowspan=2 |
|rowspan=2 |Larry Maguire26,14863.46%
|rowspan=2 |
|rowspan=2 |Ashley Duguay5,80514.09%
|rowspan=2 |
|rowspan=2 |Bill Tiessen2,9847.24%
|rowspan=2 |
|rowspan=2 |Robin Lussier6911.68%
|rowspan=2 |
|rowspan=2 |Rebecca Hein2800.68%
|
|Robert Eastcott 107 0.26%
|rowspan=2 |
|rowspan=2 |Larry Maguire
|-
|
|Vanessa Hamilton 219 0.53%
|-
| style="background-color:whitesmoke" |Churchill—Keewatinook Aski
|
|Judy Klassen5,61623.71%
|
|Cyara Bird4,71419.90%
||
|Niki Ashton11,91950.32%
|
|Ralph McLean1,1444.83%
|
|Ken Klyne2941.24%
|
|
|
|
||
|Niki Ashton
|-
| style="background-color:whitesmoke" |Dauphin—Swan River—Neepawa
|
|Cathy Scofield-Singh5,34413.17%
||
|Dan Mazier26,10364.35%
|
|Laverne Lewycky5,72414.11%
|
|Kate Storey2,2145.46%
|
|Frank Godon7111.75%
|
|Jenni Johnson4701.16%
|
|
||
|Robert Sopuck†
|-
| style="background-color:whitesmoke" |Portage—Lisgar
|
|Ken Werbiski4,77910.71%
||
|Candice Bergen31,60070.79%
|
|Cindy Friesen3,8728.67%
|
|Beverley Eert2,3565.28%
|
|Aaron Archer1,1692.62%
|
|Jerome Dondo8601.93%
|
|
||
|Candice Bergen
|-
| style="background-color:whitesmoke" |Provencher
|
|Trevor Kirczenow6,34713.14%
||
|Ted Falk31,82165.88%
|
|Erin McGee6,18712.81%
|
|Janine G. Gibson2,8845.97%
|
|Wayne Sturby1,0662.21%
|
|
|
|
||
|Ted Falk
|-
| style="background-color:whitesmoke" |Selkirk—Interlake—Eastman
|
|Detlev Regelsky6,00312.10%
||
|James Bezan31,10962.72%
|
|Robert A. Smith8,87317.89%
|
|Wayne James2,9345.92%
|
|Ian Kathwaroon6831.38%
|
|
|
|
||
|James Bezan
|}<noinclude>

Winnipeg

|-
| style="background-color:whitesmoke" |Charleswood—St. James—Assiniboia—Headingley
|
|Doug Eyolfson16,39835.47%
||
|Marty Morantz18,81540.70%
|
|Ken St. George6,55614.18%
|
|Kristin Lauhn-Jensen2,1784.71%
|
|Steven Fletcher1,9754.27%
|
|Melissa Penner1660.36%
|
|Brian Ho (Ind.)1400.30%
||
|Doug Eyolfson
|-
| style="background-color:whitesmoke" |Elmwood—Transcona
|
|Jennifer Malabar5,34612.33%
|
|Lawrence Toet16,24037.45%
||
|Daniel Blaikie19,78645.63%
|
|Kelly Manweiler1,4803.41%
|
|Noel Gautron5121.18%
|
|
|
|
||
|Daniel Blaikie
|-
| style="background-color:whitesmoke" |Kildonan—St. Paul
|
|MaryAnn Mihychuk12,35627.89%
||
|Raquel Dancho19,85644.82%
|
|Evan Krosney9,38721.19%
|
|Rylan Reed1,7774.01%
|
|Martin Deck5101.15%
|
|Spencer Katerynuk3040.69%
|
|Eduard Hiebert (Ind.)1080.24%
||
|MaryAnn Mihychuk
|-
| style="background-color:whitesmoke" |Saint Boniface—Saint Vital
||
|Dan Vandal20,30042.88%
|
|Rejeanne Caron15,43632.61%
|
|Billie Cross8,03716.98%
|
|Ben Linnick2,6715.64%
|
|Adam McAllister5911.25%
|
|
|
|Sharma Baljeet (Ind.)3030.64%
||
|Dan Vandal
|-
| style="background-color:whitesmoke" |Winnipeg Centre
|
|Robert-Falcon Ouellette10,70433.74%
|
|Ryan Dyck5,56117.53%
||
|Leah Gazan13,07341.21%
|
|Andrea Shalay1,6615.24%
|
|Yogi Henderson4741.49%
|
|Stephanie Hein2510.79%
|
|
||
|Robert-Falcon Ouellette
|-
|rowspan=2 style="background-color:whitesmoke" |Winnipeg North
|rowspan=2 |
|rowspan=2 |Kevin Lamoureux15,58147.60%
|rowspan=2 |
|rowspan=2 |Jordyn Ham6,82020.83%
|rowspan=2 |
|rowspan=2 |Kyle Mason8,46925.87%
|rowspan=2 |
|rowspan=2 |Sai Shanthanand Rajagopal9062.77%
|rowspan=2 |
|rowspan=2 |Victor Ong3240.99%
|rowspan=2 |
|rowspan=2 |Henry Hizon2790.85%
|
|Kathy Doyle (Ind.)231 0.71%
|rowspan=2 |
|rowspan=2 |Kevin Lamoureux
|-
|
|Andrew Taylor (Comm.)125 0.38%
|-
| style="background-color:whitesmoke" |Winnipeg South
||
|Terry Duguid20,18242.14%
|
|Melanie Maher18,53738.71%
|
|Jean-Paul Lapointe6,67813.94%
|
|Paul Bettess2,0734.33%
|
|Mirwais Nasiri4190.87%
|
|
|
|
||
|Terry Duguid
|-
| style="background-color:whitesmoke" |Winnipeg South Centre
||
|Jim Carr22,79945.00%
|
|Joyce Bateman15,05129.71%
|
|Elizabeth Shearer8,96517.70%
|
|James Beddome3,1736.26%
|
|Jane MacDiarmid5691.12%
|
|Linda Marynuk1040.21%
|
|
||
|Jim Carr
|}<noinclude>

Saskatchewan

Southern Saskatchewan

|-
| style="background-color:whitesmoke" |Cypress Hills—Grasslands
|
|William Caton1,5954.15%
||
|Jeremy Patzer31,14081.06%
|
|Trevor Peterson3,6669.54%
|
|Bill Clary7191.87%
|
|Lee Harding1,0752.80%
|
|Maria Lewans2200.57%
|
|
||
|David Anderson†$
|-
| style="background-color:whitesmoke" |Moose Jaw—Lake Centre—Lanigan
|
|Cecilia Melanson2,5175.60%
||
|Tom Lukiwski31,99371.12%
|
|Talon Regent7,66017.03%
|
|Gillian Walker1,2012.67%
|
|Chey Craik1,6133.59%
|
|
|
|
||
|Tom Lukiwski
|-
| style="background-color:whitesmoke" |Regina—Lewvan
|
|Winter Fedyk6,82613.23%
||
|Warren Steinley27,08852.48%
|
|Jigar Patel14,76728.61%
|
|Naomi Hunter2,0994.07%
|
|Trevor Wowk5731.11%
|
|Don Morgan2010.39%
|
|Ian Bridges (NCA)600.12%
||
|Erin Weir†
|-
|rowspan=2 style="background-color:whitesmoke" |Regina—Qu'Appelle
|rowspan=2 |
|rowspan=2 |Jordan Ames-Sinclair4,54311.72%
|rowspan=2 |
|rowspan=2 |Andrew Scheer24,46363.12%
|rowspan=2 |
|rowspan=2 |Ray Aldinger7,68519.83%
|rowspan=2 |
|rowspan=2 |Dale Dewar1,2823.31%
|rowspan=2 |
|rowspan=2 |Tracey Sparrowhawk5131.32%
|rowspan=2 |
|rowspan=2 |Kieran Szuchewycz780.20%
|
|Éric Normand (Rhino.)75 0.19%
|rowspan=2 |
|rowspan=2 |Andrew Scheer
|-
|
|James Plummer (Libert.)116 0.30%
|-
| style="background-color:whitesmoke" |Regina—Wascana
|
|Ralph Goodale15,24233.61%
||
|Michael Kram22,41849.43%
|
|Hailey Clark5,80112.79%
|
|Tamela Friesen1,3162.90%
|
|Mario Milanovski4500.99%
|
|Evangeline Godron1280.28%
|
|
||
|Ralph Goodale
|-
| style="background-color:whitesmoke" |Souris—Moose Mountain
|
|Javin Ames-Sinclair1,7184.13%
||
|Robert Kitchen35,06784.40%
|
|Ashlee Hicks3,2147.74%
|
|Judy Mergel6811.64%
|
|Phillip Zajac7021.69%
|
|
|
|Travis Patron (CNP)1680.40%
||
|Robert Kitchen
|-
| style="background-color:whitesmoke" |Yorkton—Melville
|
|Connor Moen2,4886.42%
||
|Cathay Wagantall29,52376.15%
|
|Carter Antoine4,74712.24%
|
|Stacey Wiebe1,0702.76%
|
|Ryan Schultz9412.43%
|
|
|
|
||
|Cathay Wagantall
|}<noinclude>

Northern Saskatchewan

|-
| style="background-color:whitesmoke" |Battlefords—Lloydminster
|
|Larry Ingram2,4266.77%
||
|Rosemarie Falk28,03078.25%
|
|Marcella Pedersen4,09811.44%
|
|David Kim-Cragg6051.69%
|
|Jason MacInnis6621.85%
|
|
||
|Rosemarie Falk
|-
| style="background-color:whitesmoke" |Carlton Trail—Eagle Creek
|
|Rebecca Malo2,0854.64%
||
|Kelly Block35,31378.56%
|
|Jasmine Calix5,53512.31%
|
|Dean Gibson8731.94%
|
|Cody Payant7991.78%
|
|Glenn Wright (Ind.)3440.77%
||
|Kelly Block
|-
| style="background-color:whitesmoke" |Desnethé—Missinippi—Churchill River
|
|Tammy Cook-Searson7,22526.51%
||
|Gary Vidal11,53142.30%
|
|Georgina Jolibois7,74128.40%
|
|Sarah Kraynick5431.99%
|
|Jerome Perrault2170.80%
|
|
||
|Georgina Jolibois
|-
| style="background-color:whitesmoke" |Prince Albert
|
|Estelle Hjertaas4,10710.34%
||
|Randy Hoback26,89167.72%
|
|Harmony Johnson-Harder6,92517.44%
|
|Kerri Wall8392.11%
|
|Kelly Day7781.96%
|
|Brian Littlepine (VCP)1700.43%
||
|Randy Hoback
|-
| style="background-color:whitesmoke" |Saskatoon—Grasswood
|
|Tracy Muggli8,41917.03%
||
|Kevin Waugh26,33653.27%
|
|Erika Ritchie12,67225.63%
|
|Neil Sinclair1,3202.67%
|
|Mark Friesen6921.40%
|
|
||
|Kevin Waugh
|-
| style="background-color:whitesmoke" |Saskatoon—University
|
|Susan Hayton6,14613.07%
||
|Corey Tochor24,51452.13%
|
|Claire Card13,99429.76%
|
|Jan Norris1,4012.98%
|
|Guto Penteado6671.42%
|
|Jeff Willerton (CHP)3050.65%
||
|Brad Trost§
|-
| style="background-color:whitesmoke" |Saskatoon West
|
|Shah Rukh2,8637.34%
||
|Brad Redekopp18,59747.70%
|
|Sheri Benson15,70840.29%
|
|Shawn Setyo1,0422.67%
|
|Isaac Hayes7751.99%
|
|
||
|Sheri Benson
|}

Alberta

Rural Alberta

|-
| style="background-color:whitesmoke" |Banff—Airdrie
|
|Gwyneth Midgley8,42510.79%
||
|Blake Richards55,50471.09%
|
|Anne Wilson8,18510.48%
|
|Austin Mullins3,3154.25%
|
|Nadine Wellwood2,6513.40%
|
|
||
|Blake Richards
|-
| style="background-color:whitesmoke" |Battle River—Crowfoot
|
|Dianne Clarke2,5574.10%
||
|Damien Kurek53,30985.49%
|
|Natasha Fryzuk3,1855.11%
|
|Geordie Nelson1,6892.71%
|
|David A. Michaud1,6202.60%
|
|
||
|Kevin Sorenson†$
|-
| style="background-color:whitesmoke" |Bow River
|
|Margaret Rhemtulla3,1735.75%
||
|Martin Shields46,27983.93%
|
|Lynn Macwilliam3,0865.60%
|
|Hendrika Maria Tuithof de Jonge8261.50%
|
|Tom Ikert1,3212.40%
|
|Tom Lipp (CHP)4530.82%
||
|Martin Shields
|-
| style="background-color:whitesmoke" |Foothills
|
|Cheryl Moller3,8565.88%
||
|John Barlow53,87282.13%
|
|Mickail Hendi3,7675.74%
|
|Bridget Lacey2,3983.66%
|
|Greg Hession1,6982.59%
|
|
||
|John Barlow
|-
| style="background-color:whitesmoke" |Fort McMurray—Cold Lake
|
|Maggie Farrington4,8489.51%
||
|David Yurdiga40,70679.85%
|
|Matthew Gilks2,8835.66%
|
|Brian Deheer8651.70%
|
|Matthew Barrett1,6743.28%
|
|
||
|David Yurdiga
|-
| style="background-color:whitesmoke" |Grande Prairie—Mackenzie
|
|Kenneth Munro2,9104.77%
||
|Chris Warkentin51,19883.96%
|
|Erin Aylward4,2456.96%
|
|Shelley Termuende1,1341.86%
|
|Douglas Gordon Burchill1,4922.45%
|
|
||
|Chris Warkentin
|-
|rowspan=2 style="background-color:whitesmoke" |Lakeland
|rowspan=2 |
|rowspan=2 |Mark Watson2,5654.45%
|rowspan=2 |
|rowspan=2 |Shannon Stubbs48,31483.91%
|rowspan=2 |
|rowspan=2 |Jeffrey Swanson3,7286.47%
|rowspan=2 |
|rowspan=2 |Kira Brunner1,1051.92%
|rowspan=2 |
|rowspan=2 |Alain Houle1,4682.55%
|
|Roberta Marie Graham (VCP)147 0.26%
|rowspan=2 |
|rowspan=2 |Shannon Stubbs
|-
|
|Robert McFadzean (Libert.)251 0.44%
|-
| style="background-color:whitesmoke" |Lethbridge
|
|Amy Bronson8,44313.64%
||
|Rachael Harder40,71365.79%
|
|Shandi Bleiken9,11014.72%
|
|Stephnie Watson1,9393.13%
|
|Grant Hepworth1,0071.63%
|
|Marc Slingerland (CHP)6701.08%
||
|Rachael Harder
|-
| style="background-color:whitesmoke" |Medicine Hat—Cardston—Warner
|
|Harris Kirshenbaum3,5286.64%
||
|Glen Motz42,04579.18%
|
|Elizabeth Thomson4,6398.74%
|
|Shannon Hawthorne1,2032.27%
|
|Andrew Nelson1,3502.54%
|
|Dave Phillips (Ind.)3370.63%
||
|Glen Motz
|-
| style="background-color:whitesmoke" |Peace River—Westlock
|
|Leslie Penny3,1486.09%
||
|Arnold Viersen41,65980.66%
|
|Jennifer Villebrun3,8867.52%
|
|Peter Nygaard1,3772.67%
|
|John Schrader1,5793.06%
|
|
||
|Arnold Viersen
|-
| style="background-color:whitesmoke" |Red Deer—Lacombe
|
|Tiffany Rose3,5405.25%
||
|Blaine Calkins53,84379.83%
|
|Lauren Pezzella6,0128.91%
|
|Sarah Palmer1,5962.37%
|
|Laura Lynn Thompson2,4533.64%
|
|
||
|Blaine Calkins
|-
| style="background-color:whitesmoke" |Red Deer—Mountain View
|
|Gary Tremblay3,7955.57%
||
|Earl Dreeshen54,76580.34%
|
|Logan Garbanewski4,9467.26%
|
|Conner Borlé2,0262.97%
|
|Paul Mitchell2,6373.87%
|
|
||
|Earl Dreeshen
|-
|rowspan=2 style="background-color:whitesmoke" |Yellowhead
|rowspan=2 |
|rowspan=2 |Jeremy Hoefsloot2,9125.20%
|rowspan=2 |
|rowspan=2 |Gerald Soroka45,96482.13%
|rowspan=2 |
|rowspan=2 |Kristine Bowman3,8986.96%
|rowspan=2 |
|rowspan=2 |Angelena Satdeo1,2722.27%
|rowspan=2 |
|rowspan=2 |Douglas Galavan1,5922.84%
|
|Gordon Francey (VCP)108 0.19%
|rowspan=2 |
|rowspan=2 |Jim Eglinski†
|-
|
|Cory Lystang (Libert.)222 0.40%
|}<noinclude>

Edmonton and environs

|-
|rowspan=3 style="background-color:whitesmoke" |Edmonton Centre
|rowspan=3 |
|rowspan=3 |Randy Boissonnault17,52433.01%
|rowspan=3 |
|rowspan=3 |James Cumming22,00641.45%
|rowspan=3 |
|rowspan=3 |Katherine Swampy10,95920.64%
|rowspan=3 |
|rowspan=3 |Grad Murray1,3942.63%
|rowspan=3 |
|rowspan=3 |Paul Hookham8051.52%
|
|Donovan Eckstrom (Rhino.)206 0.39%
|rowspan=3 |
|rowspan=3 |Randy Boissonnault
|-
|
|Peggy Morton (M-L)79 0.15%
|-
|
|Adil Pirbhai (Ind.)119 0.22%
|-
|rowspan=4 style="background-color:whitesmoke" |Edmonton Griesbach
|rowspan=4 |
|rowspan=4 |Habiba Mohamud8,10017.25%
|rowspan=4 |
|rowspan=4 |Kerry Diotte24,12051.36%
|rowspan=4 |
|rowspan=4 |Mark Cherrington11,80025.13%
|rowspan=4 |
|rowspan=4 |Safi Khan1,1892.53%
|rowspan=4 |
|rowspan=4 |Barbara Ellen Nichols1,0742.29%
|
|Christine Alva Armas (CHP)203 0.43%
|rowspan=4 |
|rowspan=4 |Kerry Diotte
|-
|
|Alex Boykowich (Comm.)170 0.36%
|-
|
|Andrzej Gudanowski (Ind.)216 0.46%
|-
|
|Mary Joyce (M-L)91 0.19%
|-
|rowspan=2 style="background-color:whitesmoke" |Edmonton Manning
|rowspan=2 |
|rowspan=2 |Kamal Kadri11,69221.50%
|rowspan=2 |
|rowspan=2 |Ziad Aboultaif30,42555.95%
|rowspan=2 |
|rowspan=2 |Charmaine St. Germain9,55517.57%
|rowspan=2 |
|rowspan=2 |Laura-Leah Shaw1,2552.31%
|rowspan=2 |
|rowspan=2 |Daniel Summers1,1092.04%
|
|Pam Phiri (CHP)276 0.51%
|rowspan=2 |
|rowspan=2 |Ziad Aboultaif
|-
|
|Andre Vachon (M-L)68 0.13%
|-
| style="background-color:whitesmoke" |Edmonton Mill Woods
|
|Amarjeet Sohi17,87933.62%
||
|Tim Uppal26,73650.28%
|
|Nigel Logan6,42212.08%
|
|Tanya Herbert9681.82%
|
|Annie Young9531.79%
|
|Don Melanson (CHP)2190.41%
||
|Amarjeet Sohi
|-
| style="background-color:whitesmoke" |Edmonton Riverbend
|
|Tariq Chaudary14,03822.96%
||
|Matt Jeneroux35,12657.44%
|
|Audrey Redman9,33215.26%
|
|Valerie Kennedy1,7972.94%
|
|Kevin Morris8551.40%
|
|
||
|Matt Jeneroux
|-
|rowspan=2 style="background-color:whitesmoke" |Edmonton Strathcona
|rowspan=2 |
|rowspan=2 |Eleanor Olszewski6,59211.62%
|rowspan=2 |
|rowspan=2 |Sam Lilly21,03537.07%
|rowspan=2 |
|rowspan=2 |Heather McPherson26,82347.27%
|rowspan=2 |
|rowspan=2 |Michael Kalmanovitch1,1522.03%
|rowspan=2 |
|rowspan=2 |Ian Cameron9411.66%
|
|Dougal MacDonald (M-L)77 0.14%
|rowspan=2 |
|rowspan=2 |Linda Duncan†
|-
|
|Naomi Rankin (Comm.)125 0.22%
|-
| style="background-color:whitesmoke" |Edmonton West
|
|Kerrie Johnston11,81220.14%
||
|Kelly McCauley35,71960.92%
|
|Patrick Steuber8,53714.56%
|
|Jackie Pearce1,4412.46%
|
|Matthew Armstrong1,1261.92%
|
|
||
|Kelly McCauley
|-
| style="background-color:whitesmoke" |Edmonton—Wetaskiwin
|
|Richard Wong10,80212.35%
||
|Mike Lake63,34672.43%
|
|Noah Garver9,82011.23%
|
|Emily Drzymala1,6601.90%
|
|Neil Doell1,6161.85%
|
|Travis Calliou (VCP)2110.24%
||
|Mike Lake
|-
| style="background-color:whitesmoke" |St. Albert—Edmonton
|
|Greg Springate12,47719.17%
||
|Michael Cooper39,50660.69%
|
|Kathleen Mpulubusi9,89515.20%
|
|Rob Dunbar1,5942.45%
|
|Brigitte Cecelia1,2681.95%
|
|Robert Bruce Fraser (VCP)3510.54%
||
|Michael Cooper
|-
| style="background-color:whitesmoke" |Sherwood Park—Fort Saskatchewan
|
|Ron Thiering7,35710.07%
||
|Garnett Genuis53,60073.37%
|
|Aidan Theroux8,86712.14%
|
|Laura Sanderson1,5922.18%
|
|Darren Villetard1,3341.83%
|
|Patrick McElrea (VCP)3000.41%
||
|Garnett Genuis
|-
| style="background-color:whitesmoke" |Sturgeon River—Parkland
|
|Ronald Brochu4,6966.84%
||
|Dane Lloyd53,23577.54%
|
|Guy Desforges6,94010.11%
|
|Cass Romyn1,7452.54%
|
|Tyler Beauchamp1,6252.37%
|
|Ernest Chauvet (CHP)4160.61%
||
|Dane Lloyd
|-
|}<noinclude>

Calgary

|-
|rowspan=3 style="background-color:whitesmoke" |Calgary Centre
|rowspan=3 |
|rowspan=3 |Kent Hehr17,77126.98%
|rowspan=3 |
|rowspan=3 |Greg McLean37,30656.64%
|rowspan=3 |
|rowspan=3 |Jessica Buresi6,5169.89%
|rowspan=3 |
|rowspan=3 |Thana Boonlert2,8534.33%
|rowspan=3 |
|rowspan=3 |Chevy Johnston9071.38%
|
|Eden Gould (Animal)247 0.38%
|rowspan=3 |
|rowspan=3 |Kent Hehr
|-
|
|Dawid Pawlowski (CHP)126 0.19%
|-
|
|Michael Pewtress (Ind.)138 0.21%
|-
|rowspan=2 style="background-color:whitesmoke" |Calgary Confederation
|rowspan=2 |
|rowspan=2 |Jordan Stein14,90822.62%
|rowspan=2 |
|rowspan=2 |Len Webber36,31255.11%
|rowspan=2 |
|rowspan=2 |Gurcharan Singh Sidhu7,31211.10%
|rowspan=2 |
|rowspan=2 |Natalie Odd5,7008.65%
|rowspan=2 |
|rowspan=2 |Colin Korol1,1361.72%
|
|Kevan Hunter (M-L)117 0.18%
|rowspan=2 |
|rowspan=2 |Len Webber
|-
|
|Tim Moen (Libert.)407 0.62%
|-
|rowspan=4 style="background-color:whitesmoke" |Calgary Forest Lawn
|rowspan=4 |
|rowspan=4 |Jag Anand8,69021.65%
|rowspan=4 |
|rowspan=4 |Jasraj Singh Hallan23,58559.81%
|rowspan=4 |
|rowspan=4 |Joe Pimlott4,22710.58%
|rowspan=4 |
|rowspan=4 |William Carnegie1,3183.30%
|rowspan=4 |
|rowspan=4 |Dave Levesque1,0892.72%
|
|Brent Nichols (Ind.)388 0.97%
|rowspan=4 |
|rowspan=4 |vacant
|-
|
|William James Ryder (VCP)91 0.23%
|-
|
|Esther Sutherland (CHP)222 0.56%
|-
|
|Jonathan Trautman (Comm.)134 0.34%
|-
|rowspan=2 style="background-color:whitesmoke" |Calgary Heritage
|rowspan=2 |
|rowspan=2 |Scott Forsyth8,05713.96%
|rowspan=2 |
|rowspan=2 |Bob Benzen40,81770.72%
|rowspan=2 |
|rowspan=2 |Holly Heffernan5,2789.14%
|rowspan=2 |
|rowspan=2 |Allie Tulick2,0273.51%
|rowspan=2 |
|rowspan=2 |Stephanie Hoeppner1,1231.95%
|
|Larry R. Heather (CHP)185 0.32%
|rowspan=2 |
|rowspan=2 |Bob Benzen
|-
|
|Hunter Mills (Ind.)228 0.40%
|-
| style="background-color:whitesmoke" |Calgary Midnapore
|
|Brian Aalto7,50711.03%
||
|Stephanie Kusie50,55974.26%
|
|Gurmit Bhachu6,4459.47%
|
|Taylor Stasila1,9922.93%
|
|Edward Gao1,5852.33%
|
|
||
|Stephanie Kusie
|-
| style="background-color:whitesmoke" |Calgary Nose Hill
|
|Josephine Tsang8,70315.74%
||
|Michelle Rempel38,58869.77%
|
|Patrick King5,3049.59%
|
|Jocelyn Grossé1,5542.81%
|
|Kelly Lorencz1,0891.97%
|
|Peggy Askin (M-L)710.13%
||
|Michelle Rempel
|-
| style="background-color:whitesmoke" |Calgary Rocky Ridge
|
|Todd Kathol13,01218.42%
||
|Pat Kelly48,25368.30%
|
|Nathan LeBlanc Fortin6,0518.56%
|
|Catriona Wright2,0112.85%
|
|Tyler Poulin1,0531.49%
|
|Shaoli Wang (Ind.)2700.38%
||
|Pat Kelly
|-
| style="background-color:whitesmoke" |Calgary Shepard
|
|Del Arnold8,64411.06%
||
|Tom Kmiec58,61475.01%
|
|David Brian Smith6,8288.74%
|
|Evelyn Tanaka2,3453.00%
|
|Kyle Scott1,7092.19%
|
|
||
|Tom Kmiec
|-
|rowspan=2 style="background-color:whitesmoke" |Calgary Signal Hill
|rowspan=2 |
|rowspan=2 |Ghada Alatrash9,72215.32%
|rowspan=2 |
|rowspan=2 |Ron Liepert44,42169.98%
|rowspan=2 |
|rowspan=2 |Khalis Ahmed5,3558.44%
|rowspan=2 |
|rowspan=2 |Marco Reid2,1393.37%
|rowspan=2 |
|rowspan=2 |Gord Squire1,1301.78%
|
|Christina Bassett (Rhino.)511 0.81%
|rowspan=2 |
|rowspan=2 |Ron Liepert
|-
|
|Garry Dirk (CHP)200 0.32%
|-
|rowspan=3 style="background-color:whitesmoke" |Calgary Skyview
|rowspan=3 |
|rowspan=3 |Nirmala Naidoo14,32728.34%
|rowspan=3 |
|rowspan=3 |Jag Sahota26,53352.49%
|rowspan=3 |
|rowspan=3 |Gurinder Singh Gill7,54014.92%
|rowspan=3 |
|rowspan=3 |Signe Knutson8001.58%
|rowspan=3 |
|rowspan=3 |Harry Dhillon6031.19%
|
|Joseph Alexander (CHP)483 0.96%
|rowspan=3 |
|rowspan=3 |Darshan Kang†
|-
|
|Daniel Blanchard (M-L)130 0.26%
|-
|
|Harpreet Singh Dawar (CFF)136 0.27%
|}

British Columbia

BC Interior

|-
| style="background-color:whitesmoke" |Cariboo—Prince George
|
|Tracy Calogheros10,93219.96%
||
|Todd Doherty28,84852.67%
|
|Heather Sapergia8,44015.41%
|
|Mackenzie Kerr4,9989.12%
|
|Jing Lan Yang1,2062.20%
|
|Michael Orr (Ind.)3500.64%
||
|Todd Doherty
|-
| style="background-color:whitesmoke" |Central Okanagan—Similkameen—Nicola
|
|Mary Ann Murphy16,25225.03%
||
|Dan Albas31,13547.95%
|
|Joan Phillip10,90416.79%
|
|Robert Mellalieu5,0867.83%
|
|Allan Duncan1,3452.07%
|
|Jesse Regier (Libert.)2130.33%
||
|Dan Albas
|-
|rowspan=2 style="background-color:whitesmoke" |Kamloops—Thompson—Cariboo
|rowspan=2 |
|rowspan=2 |Terry Lake19,71627.21%
|rowspan=2 |
|rowspan=2 |Cathy McLeod32,41544.74%
|rowspan=2 |
|rowspan=2 |Cynthia Egli9,93613.71%
|rowspan=2 |
|rowspan=2 |Iain Currie8,78912.13%
|rowspan=2 |
|rowspan=2 |Ken Finlayson1,1321.56%
|
|Kira Cheeseborough (Animal)321 0.44%
|rowspan=2 |
|rowspan=2 |Cathy McLeod
|-
|
|Peter Kerek (Comm.)144 0.20%
|-
|rowspan=2 style="background-color:whitesmoke" |Kelowna—Lake Country
|rowspan=2 |
|rowspan=2 |Stephen Fuhr22,62732.74%
|rowspan=2 |
|rowspan=2 |Tracy Gray31,49745.57%
|rowspan=2 |
|rowspan=2 |Justin Kulik8,38112.13%
|rowspan=2 |
|rowspan=2 |Travis Ashley5,1717.48%
|rowspan=2 |
|rowspan=2 |John Barr1,2251.77%
|
|Daniel Joseph (Ind.)152 0.22%
|rowspan=2 |
|rowspan=2 |Stephen Fuhr
|-
|
|Silverado Socrates (Ind.)67 0.10%
|-
| style="background-color:whitesmoke" |Kootenay—Columbia
|
|Robin Goldsbury6,1519.14%
||
|Rob Morrison30,16844.81%
|
|Wayne Stetski23,14934.38%
|
|Abra Brynne6,1459.13%
|
|Rick Stewart1,3782.05%
|
|Trev Miller (Animal)3390.50%
||
|Wayne Stetski
|-
|style="background-color:whitesmoke" |North Okanagan—Shuswap
|
|Cindy Derkaz16,78322.64%
||
|Mel Arnold36,15448.76%
|
|Harwinder Sandhu11,35315.31%
|
|Marc Reinarz7,82810.56%
|
|Kyle Delfing2,0272.73%
|
|
||
|Mel Arnold
|-
| style="background-color:whitesmoke" |Prince George—Peace River—Northern Rockies
|
|Mavis Erickson6,39111.59%
||
|Bob Zimmer38,47369.79%
|
|Marcia Luccock5,0699.19%
|
|Catharine Kendall3,4486.25%
|
|Ron Vaillant1,7483.17%
|
|
||
|Bob Zimmer
|-
|rowspan=3 style="background-color:whitesmoke" |Skeena—Bulkley Valley
|rowspan=3 |
|rowspan=3 |Dave Birdi4,79311.58%
|rowspan=3 |
|rowspan=3 |Claire Rattée13,75633.24%
|rowspan=3 |
|rowspan=3 |Taylor Bachrach16,94440.94%
|rowspan=3 |
|rowspan=3 |Mike Sawyer3,2807.93%
|rowspan=3 |
|rowspan=3 |Jody Craven9402.27%
|
|Danny Nunes (Ind.)164 0.40%
|rowspan=3 |
|rowspan=3 |Nathan Cullen†
|-
|
|Merv Ritchie (Ind.)157 0.38%
|-
|
|Rod Taylor (CHP)1,350 3.26%
|-
| style="background-color:whitesmoke" |South Okanagan—West Kootenay
|
|Connie Denesiuk11,70517.16%
|
|Helena Konanz24,01335.21%
||
|Richard Cannings24,80936.38%
|
|Tara Howse5,6728.32%
|
|Sean Taylor1,6382.40%
|
|Carolina Hopkins (Ind.)3590.53%
||
|Richard Cannings
|}

Fraser Valley and Southern Lower Mainland

|-
| style="background-color:whitesmoke" |Abbotsford
|
|Seamus Heffernan10,56021.58%
||
|Ed Fast25,16251.42%
|
|Madeleine Sauve8,25716.87%
|
|Stephen Fowler3,7027.56%
|
|Locke Duncan9852.01%
|
|Aeriol Alderking (CHP)2700.55%
||
|Ed Fast
|-
|rowspan=2 style="background-color:whitesmoke" |Chilliwack—Hope
|rowspan=2 |
|rowspan=2 |Kelly Velonis10,84820.18%
|rowspan=2 |
|rowspan=2 |Mark Strahl26,67249.62%
|rowspan=2 |
|rowspan=2 |Heather McQuillan8,95716.66%
|rowspan=2 |
|rowspan=2 |Arthur Green5,2439.75%
|rowspan=2 |
|rowspan=2 |Rob Bogunovic1,7603.27%
|
|Daniel Lamache (CHP)202 0.38%
|rowspan=2 |
|rowspan=2 |Mark Strahl
|-
|
|Dorothy-Jean O'Donnell (M-L)73 0.14%
|-
| style="background-color:whitesmoke" |Cloverdale—Langley City
|
|John Aldag19,54235.22%
||
|Tamara Jansen20,93637.73%
|
|Rae Banwarie10,50818.94%
|
|Caelum Nutbrown3,5726.44%
|
|Ian Kennedy9301.68%
|
|
||
|John Aldag
|-
|rowspan=2 style="background-color:whitesmoke" |Delta
|rowspan=2 |
|rowspan=2 |Carla Qualtrough22,25741.23%
|rowspan=2 |
|rowspan=2 |Tanya Corbet17,80932.99%
|rowspan=2 |
|rowspan=2 |Randy Anderson-Fennell8,79216.29%
|rowspan=2 |
|rowspan=2 |Craig DeCraene3,3876.28%
|rowspan=2 |
|rowspan=2 |Angelina Ireland9481.76%
|
|Amarit Bains (Ind.)398 0.74%
|rowspan=2 |
|rowspan=2 |Carla Qualtrough
|-
|
|Tony Bennett (Ind.)385 0.71%
|-
| style="background-color:whitesmoke" |Fleetwood—Port Kells
||
|Ken Hardie18,54537.66%
|
|Shinder Purewal16,64633.80%
|
|Annie Ohana10,56921.46%
|
|Tanya Baertl2,3784.83%
|
|Mike Poulin1,1042.24%
|
|
||
|Ken Hardie
|-
| style="background-color:whitesmoke" |Langley—Aldergrove
|
|Leon Jensen16,25425.62%
||
|Tako Van Popta29,82347.00%
|
|Stacey Wakelin10,69016.85%
|
|Kaija Farstad4,8817.69%
|
|Natalie Dipietra-Cudmore1,3052.06%
|
|Alex Joehl (Libert.)4990.79%
||
|vacant
|-
| style="background-color:whitesmoke" |Mission—Matsqui—Fraser Canyon
|
|Jati Sidhu12,29926.70%
||
|Brad Vis19,53542.41%
|
|Michael Nenn8,08917.56%
|
|John Kidder5,01910.90%
|
|Julius Nick Csaszar1,0552.29%
|
|Elaine Wismer (M-L)690.15%
||
|Jati Sidhu
|-
| style="background-color:whitesmoke" |Pitt Meadows—Maple Ridge
|
|Dan Ruimy16,12529.73%
||
|Marc Dalton19,65036.23%
|
|John Mogk12,95823.89%
|
|Ariane Jaschke4,3327.99%
|
|Bryton Cherrier6981.29%
|
|Steve Ranta (Ind.)4680.86%
||
|Dan Ruimy
|-
| style="background-color:whitesmoke" |Richmond Centre
|
|Steven Kou11,05228.47%
||
|Alice Wong19,03749.04%
|
|Dustin Innes5,61714.47%
|
|Françoise Raunet2,3766.12%
|
|Ivan Pak5381.39%
|
|Zhe Zhang (Ind.)1970.51%
||
|Alice Wong
|-
| style="background-color:whitesmoke" |South Surrey—White Rock
|
|Gordie Hogg21,69237.38%
||
|Kerry-Lynne Findlay24,31041.89%
|
|Stephen Crozier6,71611.57%
|
|Beverly Pixie Hobby4,4587.68%
|
|Joel Poulin8521.47%
|
|
||
|Gordie Hogg
|-
| style="background-color:whitesmoke" |Steveston—Richmond East
|
|Joe Peschisolido14,73135.11%
||
|Kenny Chiu17,47841.66%
|
|Jaeden Dela Torre6,32115.07%
|
|Nicole Iaci2,9727.08%
|
|
|
|Ping Chan (Ind.)4491.07%
||
|Joe Peschisolido
|-
|rowspan=3 style="background-color:whitesmoke" |Surrey Centre
|rowspan=3 |
|rowspan=3 |Randeep Singh Sarai15,45337.40%
|rowspan=3 |
|rowspan=3 |Tina Bains10,50525.42%
|rowspan=3 |
|rowspan=3 |Sarjit Singh Saran11,35327.48%
|rowspan=3 |
|rowspan=3 |John Werring2,5586.19%
|rowspan=3 |
|rowspan=3 |Jaswinder Singh Dilawari7091.72%
|
|Jeffrey Breti (Ind.)243 0.59%
|rowspan=3 |
|rowspan=3 |Randeep Sarai
|-
|
|George Gidora (Comm.)120 0.29%
|-
|
|Kevin Pielak (CHP)378 0.91%
|-
| style="background-color:whitesmoke" |Surrey—Newton
||
|Sukh Dhaliwal18,96045.04%
|
|Harpreet Singh8,82420.96%
|
|Harjit Singh Gill12,30629.23%
|
|Rabaab Khehra1,3553.22%
|
|Holly Verchère6531.55%
|
|
||
|Sukh Dhaliwal
|}<noinclude>

Vancouver and Northern Lower Mainland

|-
|rowspan=2 style="background-color:whitesmoke" |Burnaby North—Seymour
|rowspan=2 |
|rowspan=2 |Terry Beech17,77035.50%
|rowspan=2 |
|rowspan=2 |Heather Leung9,73419.45%
|rowspan=2 |
|rowspan=2 |Svend Robinson16,18532.33%
|rowspan=2 |
|rowspan=2 |Amita Kuttner4,8019.59%
|rowspan=2 |
|rowspan=2 |Rocky Dong1,0792.16%
|
|Lewis Clarke Dahlby (Libert.)219 0.44%
|rowspan=2 |
|rowspan=2 |Terry Beech
|-
|
|Robert Taylor (Ind.)271 0.54%
|-
|rowspan=2 style="background-color:whitesmoke" |Burnaby South
|rowspan=2 |
|rowspan=2 |Neelam Brar10,70623.79%
|rowspan=2 |
|rowspan=2 |Jay Shin13,91430.92%
|rowspan=2 |
|rowspan=2 |Jagmeet Singh16,95637.67%
|rowspan=2 |
|rowspan=2 |Brennan Wauters2,4775.50%
|rowspan=2 |
|rowspan=2 |Al Rawdah6451.43%
|
|Rex Brocki (Libert.)246 0.55%
|rowspan=2 |
|rowspan=2 |Jagmeet Singh
|-
|
|Brian Sproule (M-L)62 0.14%
|-
| style="background-color:whitesmoke" |Coquitlam—Port Coquitlam
||
|Ron McKinnon20,17834.69%
|
|Nicholas Insley19,78834.01%
|
|Christina Gower13,38323.00%
|
|Brad Nickason4,0256.92%
|
|Roland Spornicu7031.21%
|
|Dan Iova (VCP)980.17%
||
|Ron McKinnon
|-
|rowspan=3 style="background-color:whitesmoke" |New Westminster—Burnaby
|rowspan=3 |
|rowspan=3 |Will Davis12,41423.43%
|rowspan=3 |
|rowspan=3 |Megan Veck11,43921.59%
|rowspan=3 |
|rowspan=3 |Peter Julian23,43744.24%
|rowspan=3 |
|rowspan=3 |Suzanne de Montigny4,3788.26%
|rowspan=3 |
|rowspan=3 |Hansen Ginn8621.63%
|
|Neeraj Murarka (Libert.)307 0.58%
|rowspan=3 |
|rowspan=3 |Peter Julian
|-
|
|Ahmad Passyar (Ind.)83 0.16%
|-
|
|Joseph Theriault (M-L)57 0.11%
|-
| style="background-color:whitesmoke" |North Vancouver
||
|Jonathan Wilkinson26,97942.87%
|
|Andrew Saxton16,90826.87%
|
|Justine Bell10,34016.43%
|
|George Orr7,86812.50%
|
|Azmairnin Jadavji8351.33%
|
|
||
|Jonathan Wilkinson
|-
| style="background-color:whitesmoke" |Port Moody—Coquitlam
|
|Sara Badiei15,69529.06%
||
|Nelly Shin16,85531.21%
|
|Bonita Zarrillo16,70230.93%
|
|Bryce Watts3,8737.17%
|
|Jayson Chabot8211.52%
|
|Roland Verrier (M-L)570.11%
||
|Fin Donnelly†
|-
|rowspan=3 style="background-color:whitesmoke" |Vancouver Centre
|rowspan=3 |
|rowspan=3 |Hedy Fry23,59942.18%
|rowspan=3 |
|rowspan=3 |David Cavey10,78219.27%
|rowspan=3 |
|rowspan=3 |Breen Ouellette13,28023.74%
|rowspan=3 |
|rowspan=3 |Jesse Brown7,00212.52%
|rowspan=3 |
|rowspan=3 |Louise Kierans7241.29%
|
|Lily Bowman (Ind.)142 0.25%
|rowspan=3 |
|rowspan=3 |Hedy Fry
|-
|
|John Clarke (Libert.)379 0.68%
|-
|
|Imtiaz Popat (Ind.)38 0.07%
|-
|rowspan=3 style="background-color:whitesmoke" |Vancouver East
|rowspan=3 |
|rowspan=3 |Kyle Demes10,08518.13%
|rowspan=3 |
|rowspan=3 |Chris Corsetti6,72412.09%
|rowspan=3 |
|rowspan=3 |Jenny Kwan29,23652.57%
|rowspan=3 |
|rowspan=3 |Bridget Burns8,06214.50%
|rowspan=3 |
|rowspan=3 |Karin Litzcke6791.22%
|
|Gölök Z Buday (Libert.)562 1.01%
|rowspan=3 |
|rowspan=3 |Jenny Kwan
|-
|
|Anne Jamieson (M-L)86 0.15%
|-
|
|Peter Marcus (Comm.)177 0.32%
|-
| style="background-color:whitesmoke" |Vancouver Granville
|
|Taleeb Noormohamed14,08826.57%
|
|Zach Segal11,60521.88%
|
|Yvonne Hanson6,96013.12%
|
|Louise Boutin2,6835.06%
|
|Naomi Chocyk4310.81%
||
|Jody Wilson-Raybould (Ind.)17,26532.56%
||
|Jody Wilson-Raybould
|-
|rowspan=2 style="background-color:whitesmoke" |Vancouver Kingsway
|rowspan=2 |
|rowspan=2 |Tamara Taggart10,19423.08%
|rowspan=2 |
|rowspan=2 |Helen Quan8,80419.94%
|rowspan=2 |
|rowspan=2 |Don Davies21,68049.09%
|rowspan=2 |
|rowspan=2 |Lawrence Taylor2,6756.06%
|rowspan=2 |
|rowspan=2 |Ian Torn4270.97%
|
|Kimball Cariou (Comm.)292 0.66%
|rowspan=2 |
|rowspan=2 |Don Davies
|-
|
|Donna Peterson (M-L)91 0.21%
|-
| style="background-color:whitesmoke" |Vancouver Quadra
||
|Joyce Murray22,09343.53%
|
|Kathleen Dixon14,08227.75%
|
|Leigh Kenny7,68115.13%
|
|Geoff Wright6,30812.43%
|
|Sandra Filosof-Schipper4280.84%
|
|Austen Erhardt (Ind.)1620.32%
||
|Joyce Murray
|-
| style="background-color:whitesmoke" |Vancouver South
||
|Harjit S. Sajjan17,80841.23%
|
|Wai Young14,38833.31%
|
|Sean McQuillan8,01518.56%
|
|Judy Zaichkowsky2,4515.67%
|
|Alain Deng5321.23%
|
|
||
|Harjit Sajjan
|-
|rowspan=2 style="background-color:whitesmoke" |West Vancouver—Sunshine Coast—Sea to Sky Country
|rowspan=2 |
|rowspan=2 |Patrick Weiler22,67334.89%
|rowspan=2 |
|rowspan=2 |Gabrielle Loren17,35926.71%
|rowspan=2 |
|rowspan=2 |Judith Wilson9,02713.89%
|rowspan=2 |
|rowspan=2 |Dana Taylor14,57922.44%
|rowspan=2 |
|rowspan=2 |Robert Douglas Bebb1,0101.55%
|
|Terry Grimwood (Ind.)159 0.24%
|rowspan=2 |
|rowspan=2 |Pamela Goldsmith-Jones†$
|-
|
|Gordon Jeffrey (Rhino.)173 0.27%
|}<noinclude>

Vancouver Island

|-
| style="background-color:whitesmoke" |Courtenay—Alberni
|
|Jonah Baden Gowans8,62011.93%
|
|Byron Horner23,93633.12%
||
|Gord Johns29,79041.21%
|
|Sean Wood9,76213.51%
|
|
|
|Barbara Biley (M-L)1720.24%
||
|Gord Johns
|-
| style="background-color:whitesmoke" |Cowichan—Malahat—Langford
|
|Blair Herbert10,30115.79%
|
|Alana DeLong16,95926.00%
||
|Alistair MacGregor23,51936.06%
|
|Lydia Hwitsum13,18120.21%
|
|Rhonda Chen1,0661.63%
|
|Robin Morton Stanbridge (CHP)2020.31%
||
|Alistair MacGregor
|-
|rowspan=5 style="background-color:whitesmoke" |Esquimalt—Saanich—Sooke
|rowspan=5 |
|rowspan=5 |Jamie Hammond12,55417.90%
|rowspan=5 |
|rowspan=5 |Randall Pewarchuk13,40919.12%
|rowspan=5 |
|rowspan=5 |Randall Garrison23,88734.06%
|rowspan=5 |
|rowspan=5 |David Merner18,50626.39%
|rowspan=5 |
|rowspan=5 |Jeremy Gustafson1,0891.55%
|
|Fidelia Godron (Ind.)99 0.14%
|rowspan=5 |
|rowspan=5 |Randall Garrison
|-
|
|Louis Lesosky (Ind.)100 0.14%
|-
|
|Philip Ney (Ind.)83 0.12%
|-
|
|Josh Steffler (Libert.)287 0.41%
|-
|
|Tyson Strandlund (Comm.)111 0.16%
|-
|rowspan=4 style="background-color:whitesmoke" |Nanaimo—Ladysmith
|rowspan=4 |
|rowspan=4 |Michelle Corfield9,73513.55%
|rowspan=4 |
|rowspan=4 |John Hirst18,63425.93%
|rowspan=4 |
|rowspan=4 |Bob Chamberlin16,98523.63%
|rowspan=4 |
|rowspan=4 |Paul Manly24,84434.57%
|rowspan=4 |
|rowspan=4 |Jennifer Clarke1,0491.46%
|
|James Chumsa (Comm.)104 0.14%
|rowspan=4 |
|rowspan=4 |Paul Manly
|-
|
|Brian Marlatt (PC)207 0.29%
|-
|
|Geoff Stoneman (Ind.)235 0.33%
|-
|
|Echo White (Ind.)71 0.10%
|-
|rowspan=2 style="background-color:whitesmoke" |North Island—Powell River
|rowspan=2 |
|rowspan=2 |Peter Schwarzhoff8,25113.11%
|rowspan=2 |
|rowspan=2 |Shelley Downey20,50232.59%
|rowspan=2 |
|rowspan=2 |Rachel Blaney23,83437.88%
|rowspan=2 |
|rowspan=2 |Mark de Bruijn8,89114.13%
|rowspan=2 |
|rowspan=2 |Brian Rundle1,1021.75%
|
|Carla Neal (M-L)48 0.08%
|rowspan=2 |
|rowspan=2 |Rachel Blaney
|-
|
|Glen Staples (Ind.)287 0.46%
|-
| style="background-color:whitesmoke" |Saanich—Gulf Islands
|
|Ryan Windsor11,32616.62%
|
|David Busch13,78420.23%
|
|Sabina Singh8,65712.70%
||
|Elizabeth May33,45449.09%
|
|Ron Broda9291.36%
|
|
||
|Elizabeth May
|-
|rowspan=4 style="background-color:whitesmoke" |Victoria
|rowspan=4 |
|rowspan=4 |Nikki Macdonald15,95222.30%
|rowspan=4 |
|rowspan=4 |Richard Caron9,03812.63%
|rowspan=4 |
|rowspan=4 |Laurel Collins23,76533.21%
|rowspan=4 |
|rowspan=4 |Racelle Kooy21,38329.89%
|rowspan=4 |
|rowspan=4 |Alyson Culbert9201.29%
|
|Robert Duncan (Comm.)113 0.16%
|rowspan=4 |
|rowspan=4 |Murray Rankin†
|-
|
|Jordan Reichert (Animal)221 0.31%
|-
|
|Keith Rosenberg (VCP)46 0.06%
|-
|
|David Shebib (Ind.)111 0.16%
|}<noinclude>

Nunavut

|-
| style="background-color:whitesmoke" |Nunavut
|
|Megan Pizzo Lyall2,91830.87%
|
|Leona Aglukkaq2,46926.12%
||
|Mumilaaq Qaqqaq3,86140.84%
|
|Douglas Roy2062.18%
||
|Hunter Tootoo†
|}<noinclude>

Northwest Territories

|-
| style="background-color:whitesmoke" |Northwest Territories
||
|Michael McLeod6,46739.70%
|
|Yanik D'Aigle4,15725.52%
|
|Mary Beckett3,64022.34%
|
|Paul Falvo1,73110.63%
|
|Luke Quinlan2961.82%
||
|Michael McLeod
|}<noinclude>

Yukon

|-
| style="background-color:whitesmoke" |Yukon
||
|Larry Bagnell7,03433.47%
|
|Jonas Jacot Smith6,88132.74%
|
|Justin Lemphers4,61721.97%
|
|Lenore Morris2,20110.47%
|
|Joseph Zelezny2841.35%
||
|Larry Bagnell
|}<noinclude>

Notes

References 

2019 Canadian federal election
Lists of Canadian politicians